= Presidents of the United States on U.S. postage stamps =

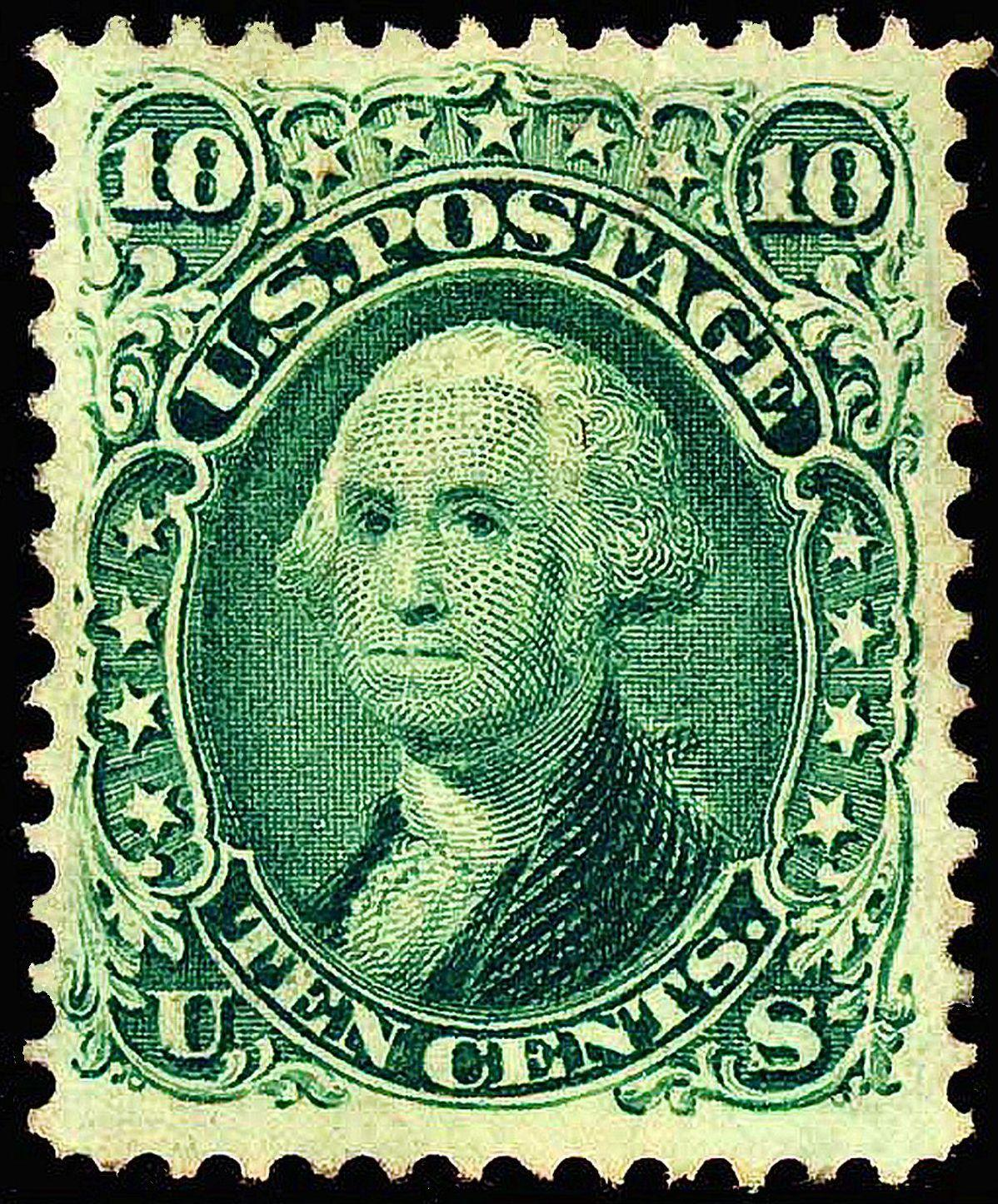
George Washington -; Issue of 1861 Engraving modeled after the Gilbert Stuart portrait

Presidents of the United States have frequently appeared on U.S. postage stamps since the mid-19th century. The United States Post Office Department released its first two postage stamps in 1847, featuring George Washington on one, and Benjamin Franklin on the other. The advent of presidents on postage stamps has been definitive to U.S. postage stamp design since the first issues were released and set the precedent that U.S. stamp designs would follow for many generations.

The paper postage stamp itself was born of utility (in England, 1840), as something simple and easy to use was needed to confirm that postage had been paid for an item of mail. People could purchase several stamps at one time and no longer had to make a special trip to pay for postage each time an item was mailed. The postage stamp design was usually printed from a fine engraving and were almost impossible to forge adequately. This is where the appearance of presidents on stamps was introduced. Moreover, the subject theme of a president, along with the honors associated with it, is what began to define the stamp issues in ways that took it beyond the physical postage stamp itself and is why people began to collect them. There exist entire series of stamp issues whose printing was inspired by the subject alone.

The portrayals of Washington and Franklin on U.S. postage are among the most definitive of examples and have appeared on numerous postage stamps. The presidential theme in stamp designs would continue as the decades passed, each period issuing stamps with variations of the same basic presidential-portrait design theme. The portrayals of U.S. presidents on U.S. postage has remained a significant subject and design theme on definitive postage throughout most of U.S. stamp issuance history.

Engraved portrayals of U.S. presidents were the only designs found on U.S. postage from 1847 until 1869, with the one exception of Benjamin Franklin, whose historical stature was comparable to that of a president, although his appearance was also an acknowledgement of his role as the first U.S. postmaster general. During this period, the U.S. Post Office issued various postage stamps bearing the depictions of George Washington foremost, Benjamin Franklin, Thomas Jefferson, Andrew Jackson, and Abraham Lincoln, the last of whom first appeared in 1866, one year after his death. After twenty-two years of issuing stamps with only presidents and Franklin, the Post Office in 1869 issued a series of eleven postage stamps that were generally regarded by the American public as being abruptly different from the previous issues and whose designs were considered at the time to be a break from the tradition of honoring American forefathers on the nation's postage stamps. These new issues had other nonpresidential subjects and a design style that was also different, one issue bearing a horse, another a locomotive, while others were depicted with nonpresidential themes. Washington and Lincoln were to be found only once in this series of eleven stamps, which some considered to be below par in design and image quality. As a result, this pictographic series was met with general disdain and proved so unpopular that the issues were consequently sold for only one year where remaining stocks were pulled from post offices across the United States.

In 1870 the Post Office resumed its tradition of printing postage stamps with the portraits of American presidents and Franklin but now added several other famous Americans, including Henry Clay, Daniel Webster, Alexander Hamilton and General Winfield Scott among other notable Americans. Indeed, the balance had now shifted somewhat; of the ten stamps issued in 1870, only four offered presidential images. Moreover, presidents also appeared on less than half of the denominations in the definitive sets of 1890, 1917, 1954 and 1965, while occupying only a slight majority of values in the definitive issues of 1894–1898, 1902 and 1922–1925.

Presidential images did, however, overwhelmingly dominate the definitive sets released in 1908 and 1938: on the former, 10 of the 11 stamps offered the same image of Washington, while in the 1938 "prexies" series, 29 of the 32 stamps presented busts of presidents. The 1975 Americana Series marked a clear end to this tradition, being the first U.S. definitive issue on which no presidential portrait appeared; and presidents played only a minor role in the subsequent Great Americans series.

Every deceased U.S. president as of 2026 has appeared on at least one U.S. postage stamp, and all but Richard Nixon, Gerald Ford, and George H. W. Bush have appeared on at least two. Per postal office regulations, no living figure is permitted to be the subject of a postage stamp, so no living president is permitted on a postage stamp.

== First appearances ==
The portrayals of various American presidents made their first appearances on U.S. postage at different times for very different reasons. Among the most definitive is George Washington, whose engraving (along with that of Benjamin Franklin) appeared on the first U.S. postage stamps released by the U.S. Post Office, on July 1 of 1847. Thomas Jefferson first appeared on U.S. postage in March 1856, nine years after the first issues were released. Fifteen years of stamp issuance would pass before Andrew Jackson would appear on a U.S. postage stamp. However, by this time, Jackson had already been presented on two Confederate stamps (both 2-cent values), making him the only U.S. president introduced to postage by the Confederacy rather than the U.S. Post Office. Abraham Lincoln appeared for the first time on a U.S. postage stamp with the issue of 1866, released on April 14, 1866, the first anniversary of his death. Up until this time only the portrayals of Washington, Franklin, Jefferson and Jackson were found on U.S. postage.

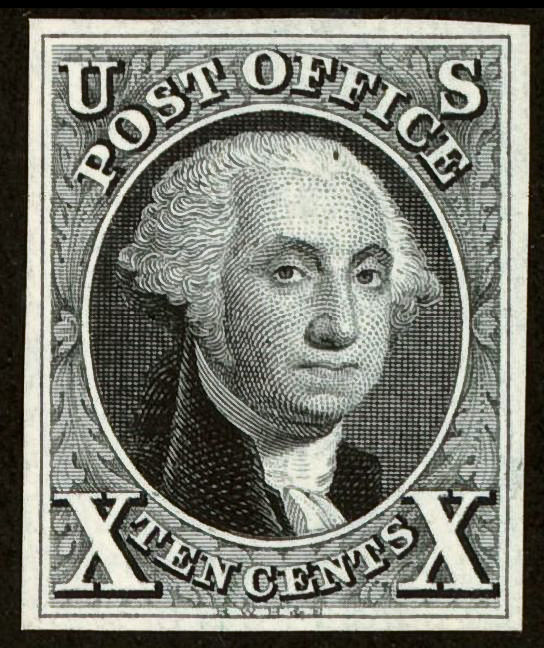
George Washington Issue of 1847

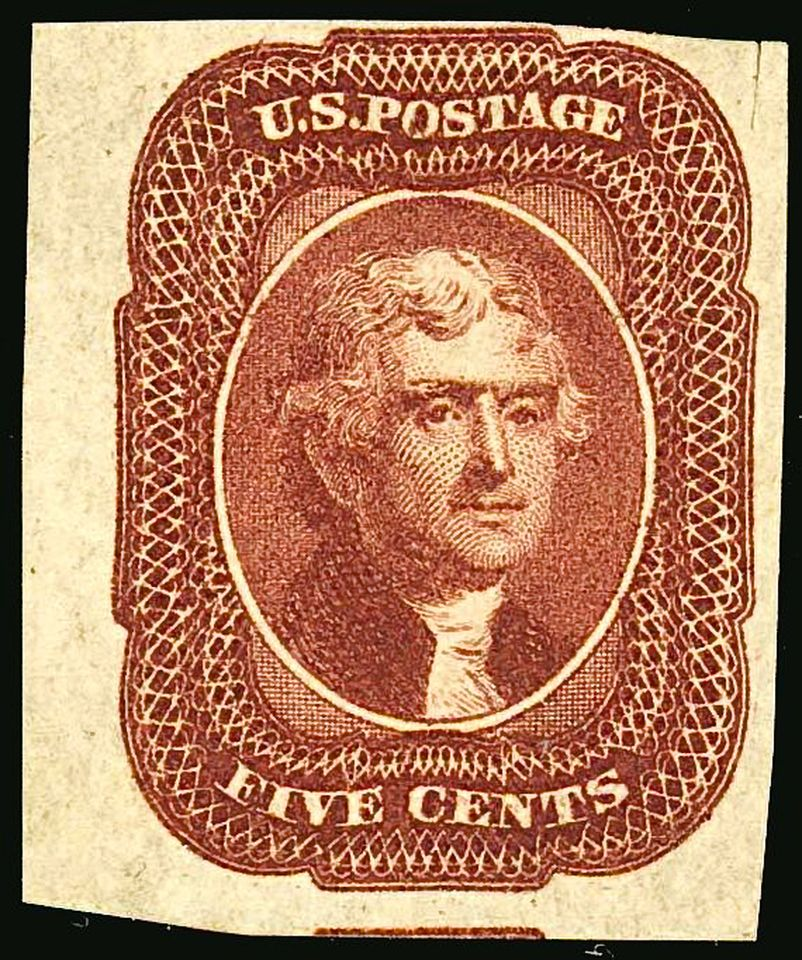
Thomas Jefferson Issue of 1856

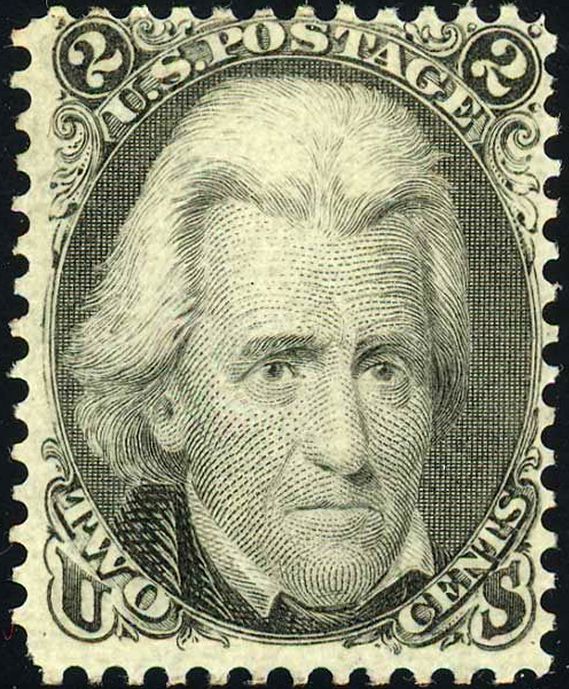
Andrew Jackson Issue of 1863

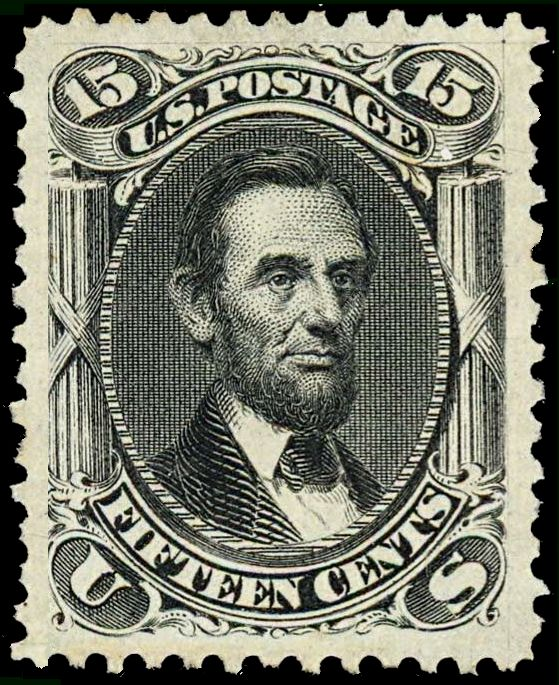
Abraham Lincoln Issue of 1866

- The First Washington postage stamp. The 5-cent Franklin and the 10-cent Washington postage stamps issued in 1847 were the first postage stamps issued and authorized for nationwide postal duty by the U.S. Post Office. The firm of Rawdon, Wright, Hatch, and Edson of New York City were given a four-year contract to print the first U.S. postage stamps in 1847. The initials: "RWH&E" are clearly engraved at the bottom of both stamps. The engraving of Washington is identical to the one by the portrait engraver Asher Brown Durand on a Bank-Note issued by Fairfield County Bank of Connecticut, during a period when many banks issued their own forms of paper currency. Both the Washington and Franklin issues were reprinted in 1875 from re-engraved images subtly different from the originals.
- In March 1856 the Post Office issued the first postage stamp to feature Thomas Jefferson. The exact date of issue is not clear. Scott Specialized Catalogue of United States Stamps and Covers establishes the release date with the first known use of this issue, March 24, 1856. The first issue of this stamp was in imperforate form, engraved and printed by Toppan, Carpenter, Casilear & Co. The Jefferson issue saw postal duty from the spring of 1856 to the summer of 1857. The engraving of Jefferson was modeled after a portrait of the president by Gilbert Stuart. By mid-1857 the stamps were issued with the top and bottom design projections omitted and with perforations. This printing was issued in at least six major color variations.
- On July 1, 1863, the Post Office issued the 2-cent Jackson stamp, commonly referred to by collectors as the 'Black Jack' stamp. Printed by the National Bank Note Company, it was released on the same day the new drop letter rate (the fee for mail delivered within city limits) was raised to two cents. Jackson is the third U.S. president to be honored on U.S. postage.
- On or near April 14, 1866, one year after Lincoln's assassination in 1865, the U.S. Post Office issued its first postage stamp honoring the fallen president. The engraving of Lincoln was rendered by Joseph Ourdan after a photograph by C.S. German.

== George Washington ==
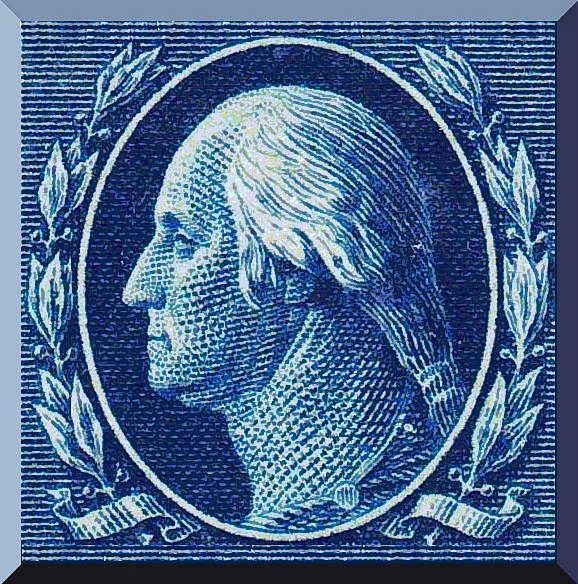
Washington This engraving was modeled after a bust of Washington by the French sculptor Jean Antoine Houdon.

George Washington (February 22, 1732 – December 14, 1799) was the first president of the United States, serving from 1789 to 1797, and before this, served as the commander of the Continental Army in the American Revolutionary War from 1775 to 1783. The Electoral College elected Washington unanimously in 1789, and again in the 1792 election. George Washington has remained the only American president to have received 100 percent of the electoral votes. Washington took his oath of office while standing on the balcony of Federal Hall on Wall Street in New York City.

The chronology of presidents on U.S. postage begins with George Washington. Near the end of Washington's second term as president, Martha Washington commissioned the well-known portrait artist Gilbert Stuart to paint both her portrait and the president's. Stuart was known for the length of time it took him to complete a painting, and consequently neither the president nor his wife ever saw the finished paintings. The two portraits remained unfinished and tacked to a door in Stuart's Boston studio until his death in 1828. In 1860, artist Rembrandt Peale finished Stuart's work, filling in where this artist had left off. Stuart's portrait of Washington became the model image for a good number of postage issues of the 19th and 20th centuries.

George Washington remains the central figure found on U.S. postage. The first president appears on the face of U.S. postage more than any other president. The engraved images of Washington found on the early issues set the precedent that all U.S. postage issues would follow in the following decades. Indeed, in virtually every U.S. definitive stamp series offered between 1851 and 1932, Washington appeared on the normal letter-rate value (the only exception being the short-lived 1869 pictorial issue); other presidents, statesmen and famous Americans were confined to the less commonly used denominations. Since the first U.S. postage stamp was issued by the U.S. Post Office, more examples of George Washington have appeared on U.S. postage than for all other American presidents combined, including Thomas Jefferson, Andrew Jackson, Abraham Lincoln, and even the frequently honored Benjamin Franklin (who was not president).

Examples of all the various Washington stamps are too numerous to include in this section, as many of the issues are very similar with only differences in color and denomination, such as the Washington–Franklin issues. Featured below are the issues that are unique in their designs and the most definitive.

=== Pre-history ===
When the U.S. Post Office issued its 10-cent Washington value of 1847 as part of the first U.S. national postage stamp release, Washington's image had already been appearing for five years on postage stamps printed in the U.S. by private letter-carrying services and by local postmasters. Indeed, the first postage stamp ever produced in the Western Hemisphere was a 3-cent issue bearing a somewhat crude engraving of Washington, introduced in 1842 by the City Despatch Post in New York City.

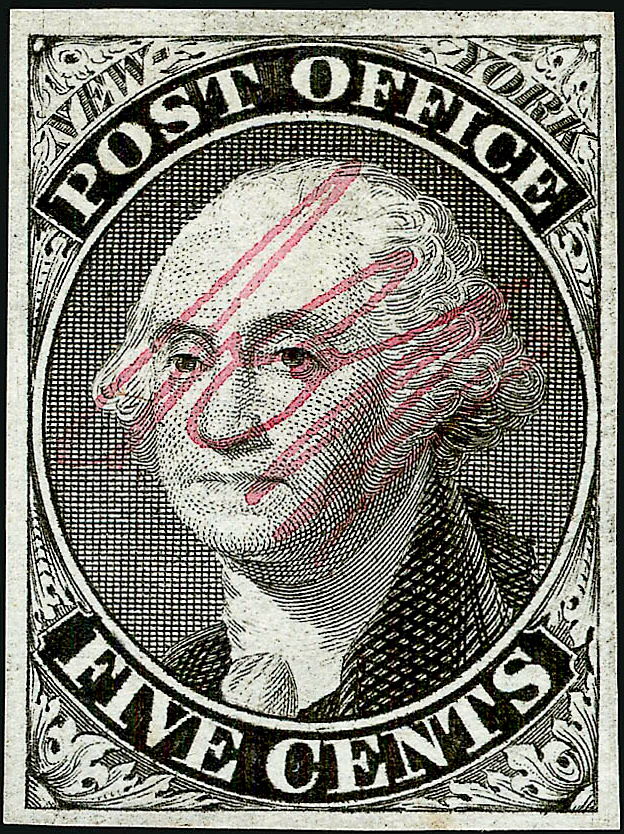
N. Y. Postmaster's Provisional, 1845

In 1845, the New York Postmaster issued a provisional stamp for local use which offered a far more elegant image of Washington, engraved by the firm of Rawdon, Wright and Hatch (the same company that, two years later, would produce the first National U.S. postage stamps). That year, Washington also appeared on a very rare 5-cent provisional issue offered by the post office in Millbury, Massachusetts. Washington was the only president depicted on any of the postmasters' provisionals released during this period.

=== Classic period ===
Postage stamp designs of this period were typically taken from paintings and other works by famous artists that set the precedent for stamp designs in the ensuing years of American stamp production. Engravers from this period typically used the works of John Trumbull, Gilbert Stuart and Jean Antoine Houdon as models for their engravings.

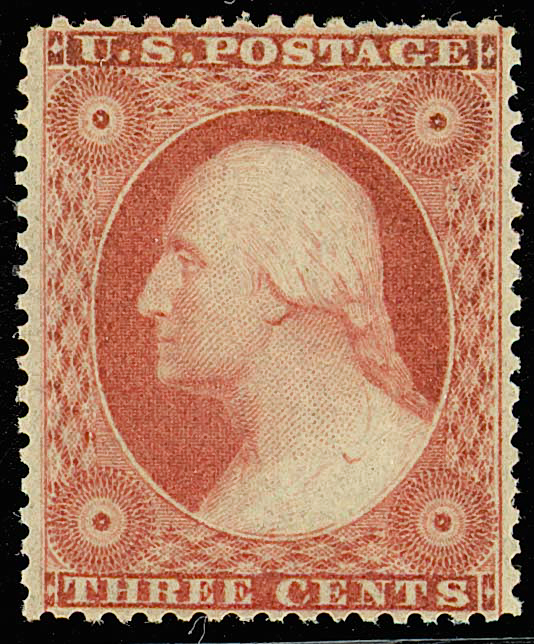
Issue of 1851/1857

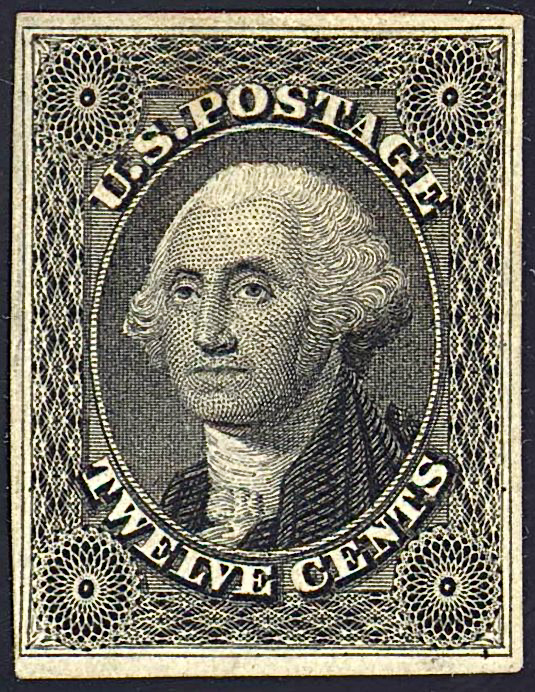
Issue of 1851

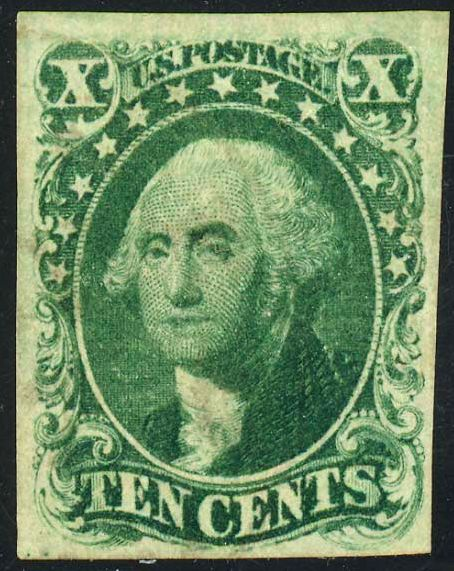
Issue of 1855

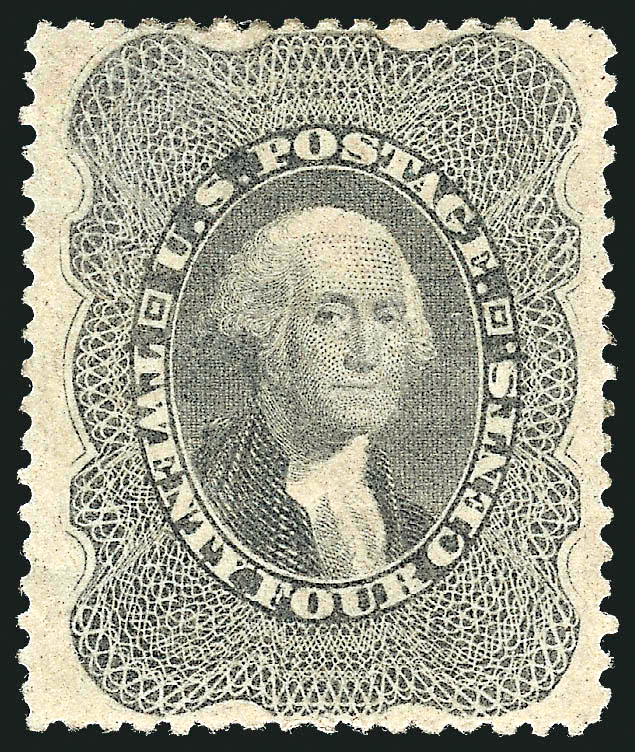
Issue of 1860

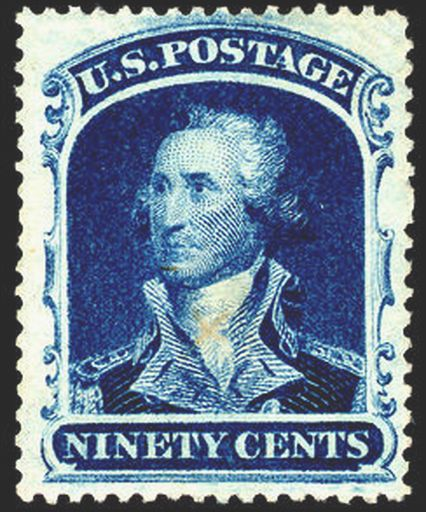
Issue of 1860

- On July 1, 1851, the U.S. Post Office issued a 3-cent postage stamp. Because of die recuts, double transfers from die to plate and different paper used for its printing, this issue comes in numerous varieties. The authoritative book on the issue, 'Classic U.S. Stamps 1845–1869' was written by Carroll Chase, published in 1962. Engraving of image taken from a sculpture by Jean Antoine Houdon. The Post Office did not produce perforated versions of this stamp until 1857.
- The Post Office released the 12-cent Washington on August 4 of 1851. The engraving of Washington is modeled after a portrait by Gilbert Stuart. When the 12¢ issue was printed the stamp was the highest U.S. denomination ever issued. The issue was printed by Toppan, Carpenter, Casilear & Co. A perforated version appeared in 1857.
- In 1855 the postal rate for mail bound for destinations over 3,000 miles was increased from 6 cents to 10 cents, a change that prompted the issue of the 1855 10-cent Washington stamp. This 10-cent green issue was printed by Toppan, Carpenter, Casilear & Co. who reused the engraving of Washington (the vignette) of the 12-cent Washington 1851 Issue for this 10-cent postage stamp. The engraving was modeled after Gilbert Stuart's portrait of Washington. A perforated version appeared in 1857.
- In 1857 printing plates were made for a 24-cent Washington issue, but the stamp itself was not produced until 1860; the earliest known date of usage is July 7.
- On August 13, 1860, the Post Office issued the Washington 90¢ issue. Washington's engraving was modeled after a portrait by John Trumbull, titled George Washington before the Battle of Trenton, painted in 1792. It was only issued in the year 1860 and because of its high denomination only 29,000 copies were made and surviving examples are scarce. There were very few occasions where the amount of postage required to mail an item cost as much as 90¢ and as a result, genuine postally used examples of this issue are worth about twice as much as unused specimens.

=== Civil War era ===
Abraham Lincoln assumed office in March 1861 and just one month later the Confederate forces fired on Fort Sumter which marked the beginning of the American Civil War. Issued only months after the Battle of Fort Sumter, no other series of stamps issued during the Classic Period has such an important connection to American history as the 1861 National Bank Note Company Issues. As in the series issued between 1851 and 1860, Washington occurs five times in the 1861 group while Franklin occurs twice and Jefferson once.

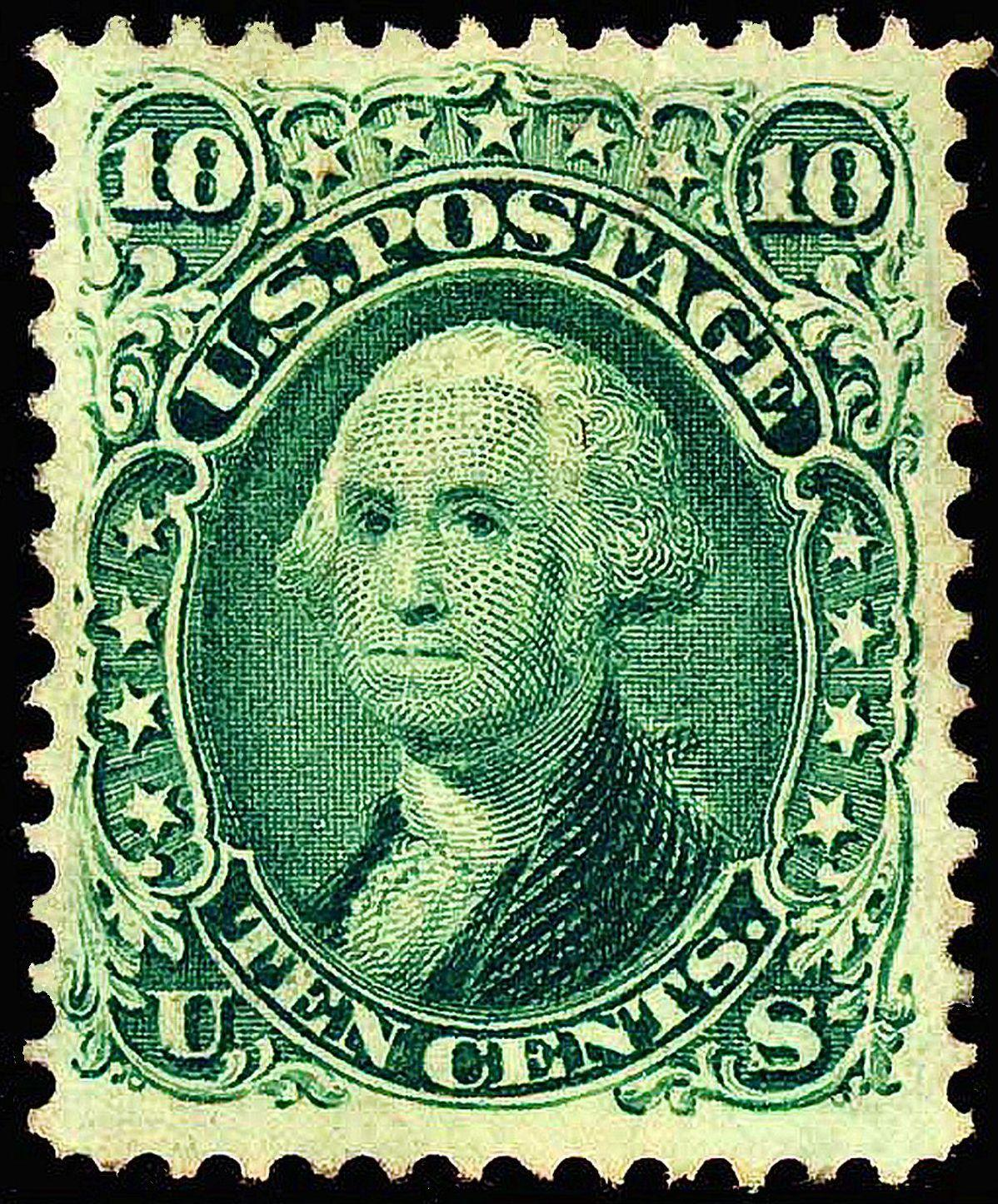
Issue of 1861

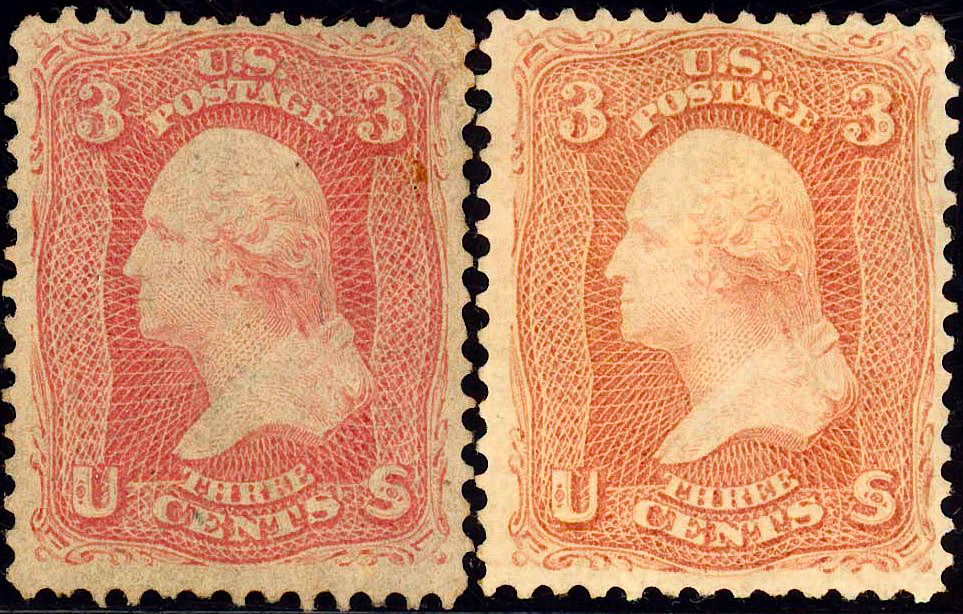
Issue of 1861

- The Post Office released the 10¢ Washington green issue on August 20, 1861. Washington's portrayal was engraved by William Marshall who employed Gilbert Stuart's unfinished portrait of the first American president for his model.
- The 3¢ Washington of series of 1861 was issued on August 19, the same year. The engraved imagery was modeled after a bust of Washington by French sculptor Jean Antoine Houdon.

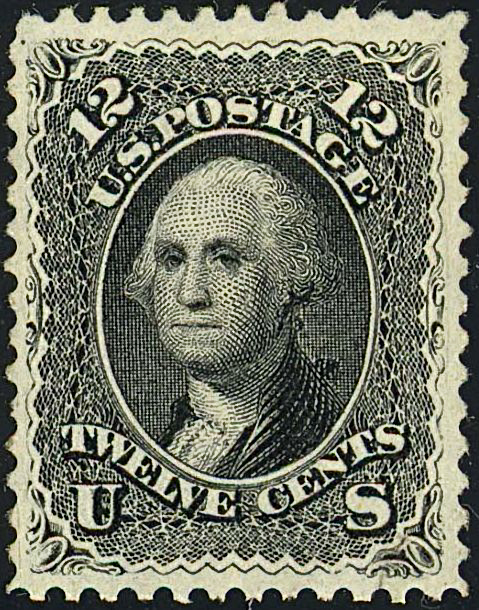
Issue of 1861

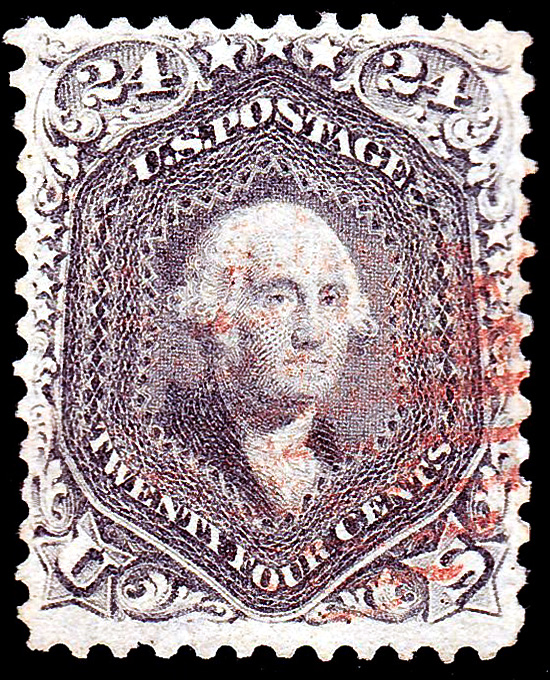
Issue of 1862

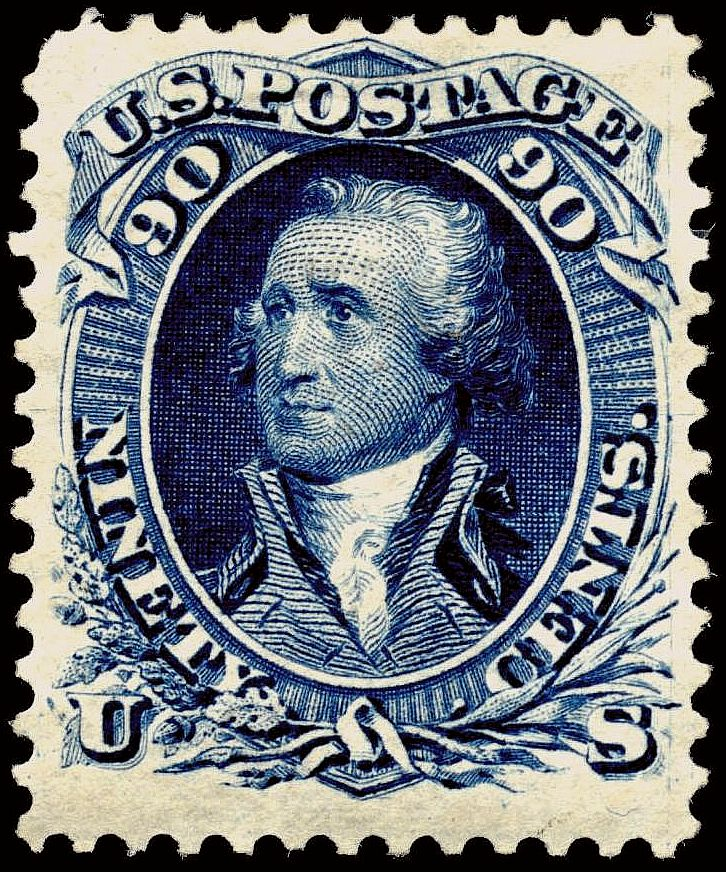
Issue of 1861

- 12¢ Washington issue of 1861. The National Bank Note Company was founded in 1859, and William Marshall was one of the first portrait engravers hired. By early 1860, Marshall was given the task of engraving Washington's portrayal for the 1861 Issue. He was sent to Boston to use Gilbert Stuart's portrait painting of George Washington as his model for the new engraving.
- The 24¢ lilac was issued January 7, 1862. The engraving was taken from same Gilbert Stuart painting, although the image was reversed. The engraver was William Marshall, the same artist who produced the 10 and 12 cent Washington 1861 Issues. William D. Nichols and Cyrus Durand (inventor of the machine used to produce intricate lathe work in engravings) was the engraver of the stamp's frame work.
- The 90¢ Washington stamp was issued in the last two weeks in August 1861 to only several post offices. The earliest known use on cover is November 27, 1861. The engraving of Washington was taken from the same John Trumbull portrait as was the issue of 1860.

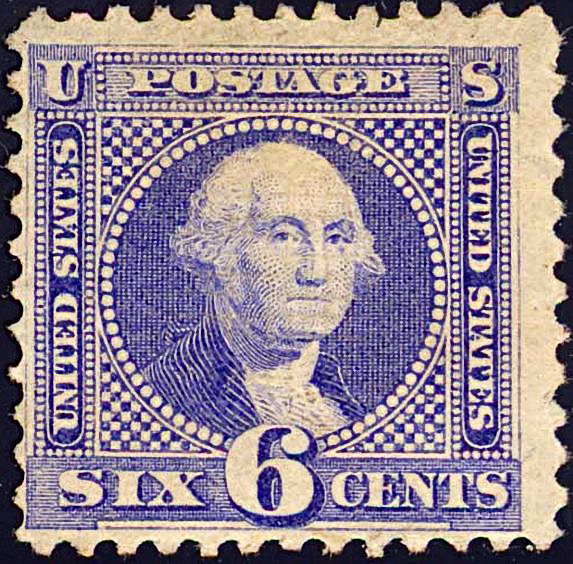
Issue of 1869

- In 1869 the ill-fated 'pictorial issue' was released. Most of the stamp issues from this series featured scenes of various sorts. The Washington stamp of this series was criticized as much as the others but for its plain graphic features, like the checker background surrounding the vignette. The stamp format was designed by E. Pitcher while the engraving was modeled after a Gilbert Stuart portrait of Washington.
- George Washington is also found on an 1863 Civil War issue of the Confederate States.

=== After Civil War ===
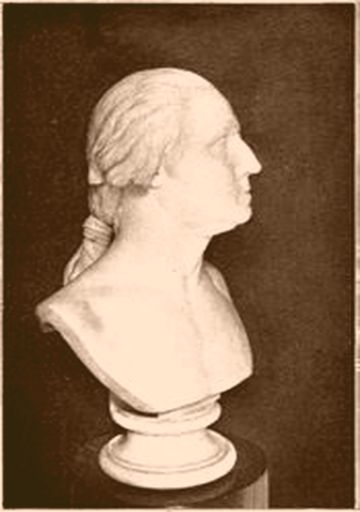
Bust of Washington by Jean Antoine Houdon This sculpture served as the model for Washington engravings on a variety of postage issues of the late 19th century

The ending of the American Civil War marked a beginning in U.S. stamp subject and design change. The Union victory brought with it a strong American nationalism among the populace throughout the north and much of the country. This national sentiment was largely responsible for the various Civil War figures to appear on U.S. postage. Until 1869, with the one exception of Benjamin Franklin, only American presidents were found on U.S. postage. In April 1870, however, the images of Henry Clay, Daniel Webster, Winfield Scott, Alexander Hamilton and Oliver Hazard Perry appeared on new the 12¢, 15¢, 24¢, 30¢ and 90¢ stamps, and the following year Edwin M. Stanton, the U.S. secretary of war under Lincoln, appeared on a 7-cent postage stamp.

1870s

The postage issued in the US during this time was printed by the National Bank Note Company (NBNCo) on white wove paper. The first printing was issued with 'grills', tiny cuts in the paper to absorb ink. Later reprintings were issued without grilling. The National Bank Note Company's contract expired in 1873, and the Continental Bank Note Company (CBNC) won the contract to continue printing the series and took over some of the dies and plates used by NBNCo. The new company employed secret marks on the lower-value stamps to distinguish its work from the first printing. The green Washington 3¢ issue was printed in such large quantities that postally used examples remain inexpensive to this day, from pennies to a few dollars, depending on type of cancellation and condition. (The green variety was reprinted again by the American Bank Note Company (AmBNC), also in very large quantities, and issued on July 16, 1881.) The 3-cent Washington design was printed yet a fourth time, in vermillion, in 1887. The 3-cent issues paid the domestic letter rate for a half-ounce letter.

The profile image of George Washington found on various postage issues of the late 19th century and early 20th century is modeled after a bust of Washington by the sculptor Jean-Antoine Houdon. Several engravers of presidential portraits on U.S. postage have modeled their engravings after Houdon's sculptures.

Large Bank Notes of the 1870s

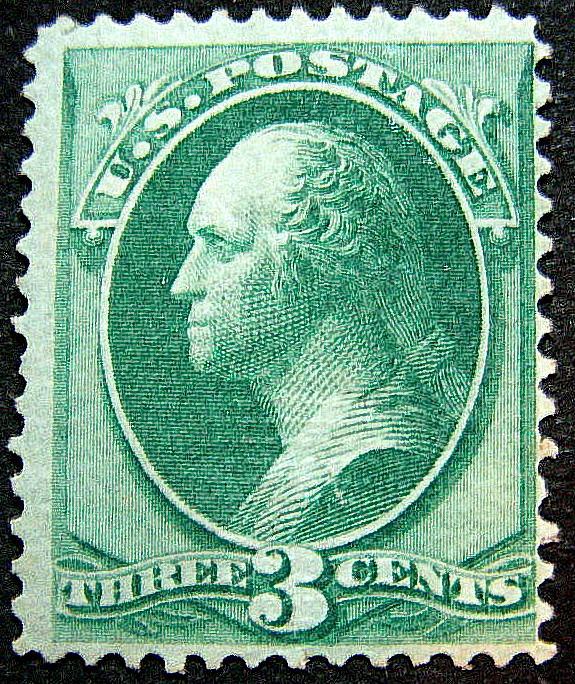
Issue of 1870 NBNCo

Engraving taken from bust by Jean Antoine Houdon

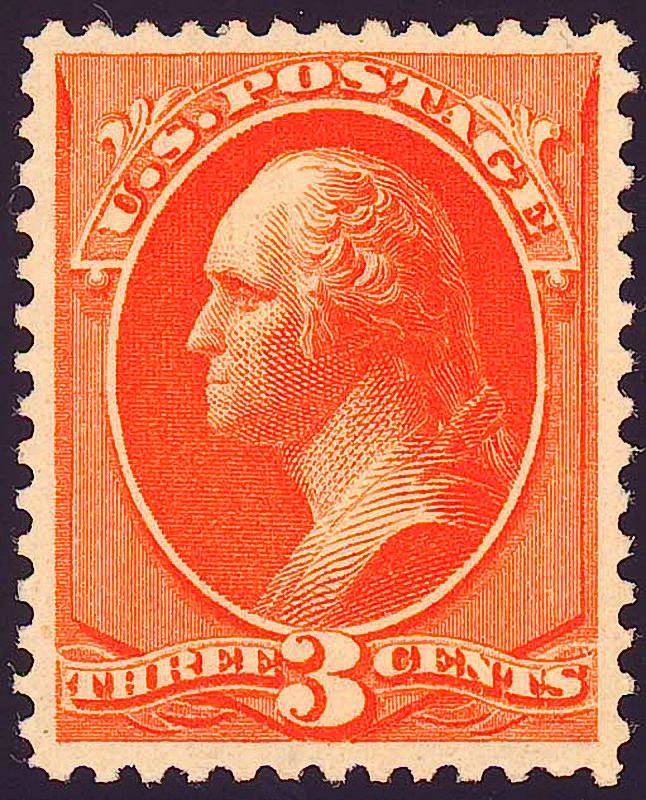
Issue of 1887 (reprint of 1870 issue)

Jean Antoine Houdon's portrait sculpture of Washington was the result of a specific invitation from Benjamin Franklin to come to the United States so that Washington could model for him. Washington sat for wet clay life models and a plaster life mask in 1785. These models served for many commissions of Washington and eventually were used as models for the engravings of Washington on several US Postage issues of the 1870s, 1880s and 1890s.

1880s

In 1883 the Post Office reduced the first-class letter rate from 3 cents to 2 cents for a half-ounce letter mailed within the continental United States, which Congress approved on March 3, 1883, effective October 1, 1883. The Post Office immediately issued a 2-cent Washington stamp, so that the first president's image would remain visible on normal letters.

American Bank Note Company
Engraving taken from bust by Jean Antoine Houdon

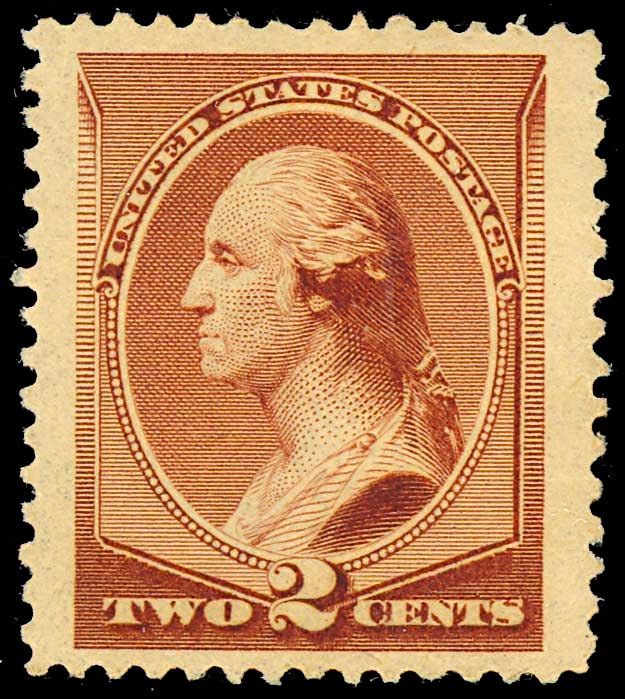
Issue of 1883

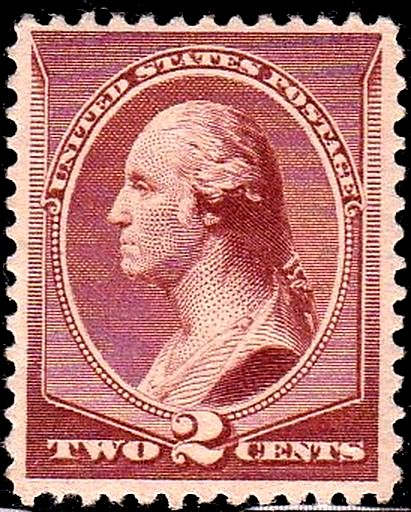
Issue of 1883

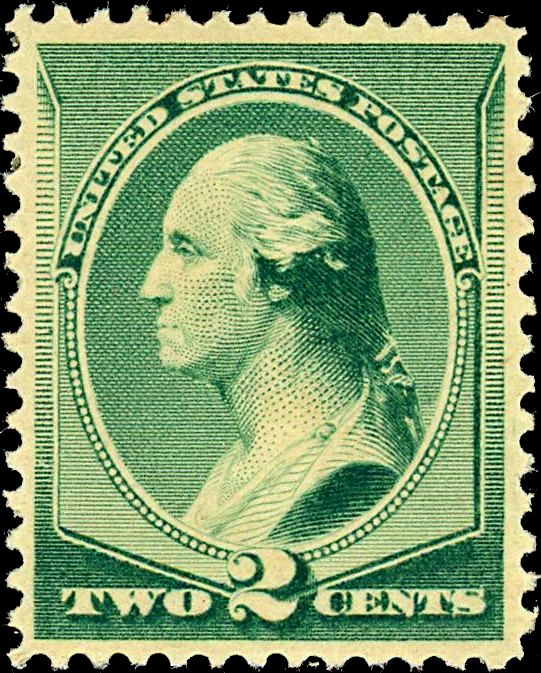
Issue of 1887

1890s

Stamp issues during the 1890s were first printed by the American Bank Note Company in 1890 and then by the Bureau of Engraving and Printing in 1894. The image for both issues was produced by an engraving that was modeled after a bust of Washington by sculptor Jean Antoine Houdon.

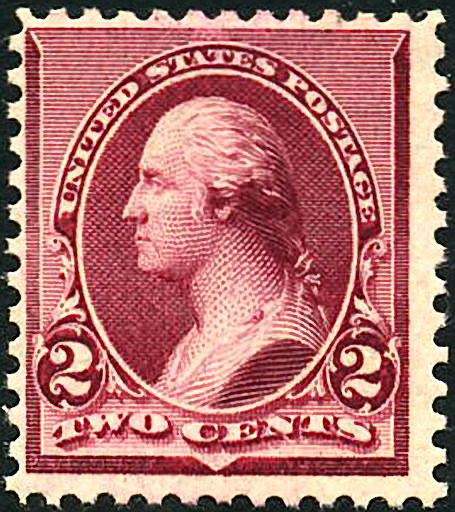
Issue of 1890

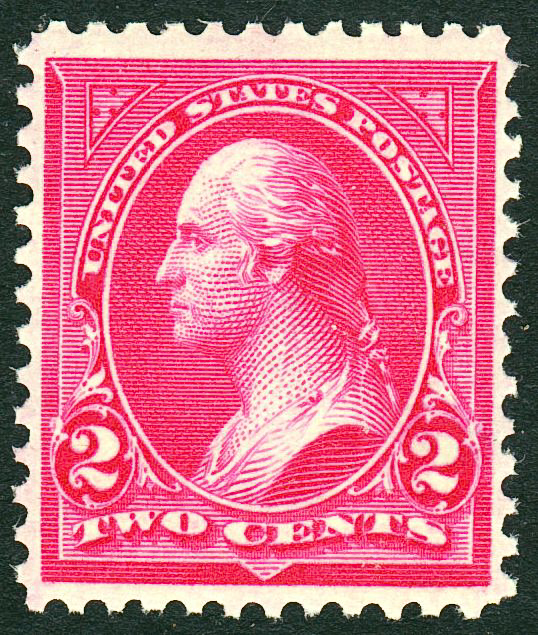
Issue of 1895

- The American Bank Note 1890 issue, 2c, lake variety, Washington stamp (left) was issued on February 22, 1890, becoming the first stamp to be issued on a president's birthday.
- Bureau of Engraving and Printing issues, struck from the same dies as the ABN 1890 issues with minor changes in the frame work, three different styled triangles, known to collectors as the 'Bureau Triangles'. The 2¢ Washington paid the letter domestic letter rate and was printed in such large quantities that numerous color variations exist.

=== Early 20th century ===
At the beginning of the 20th century, George Washington continued to be the most prominent subject depicted on the face of U.S. postage stamps. Washington would remain the most prevalent figure on U.S. postage for most of the 20th century. Only Benjamin Franklin is second to Washington, in part because Franklin is depicted on the numerous denominations of the Washington–Franklin series nearly as often as Washington. Ironically, George Washington did not appear on a commemorative issue until 1925 when he was featured on a stamp commemorating another historical event.

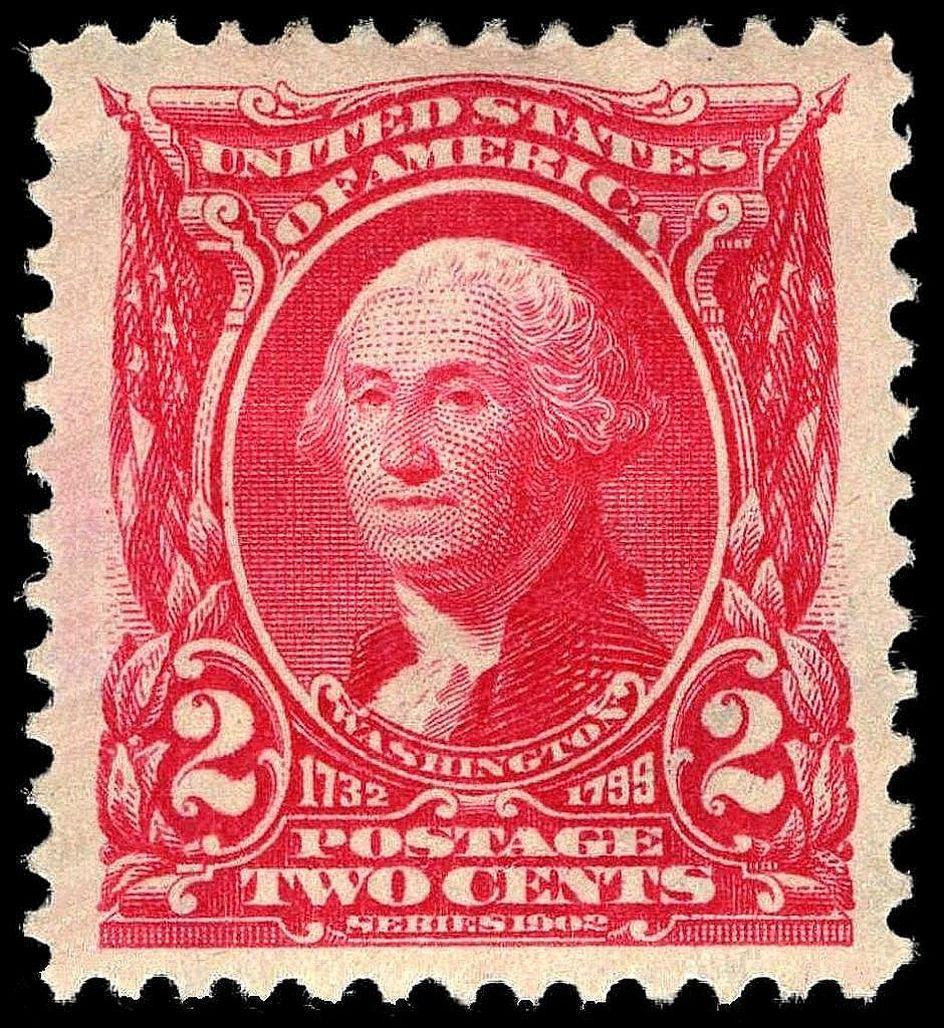
Issue of 1903

- Issued on January 17, 1903, the 2¢ carmine red Washington postage stamp featured an engraving of Washington inspired and modeled after a painting by Gilbert Stuart which features a one quarter left image of Washington. R. Ostrander Smith designed the stamp. The vignette with its two American flags is often referred to as the Washington "Flag" stamp. Washington's portrait was engraved by George F. C. Smillie who engraved a variety of stamp images for the Bureau of Engraving and Printing. The 1903 issue is one among the second series of stamp issues that were produced that year by the Bureau.

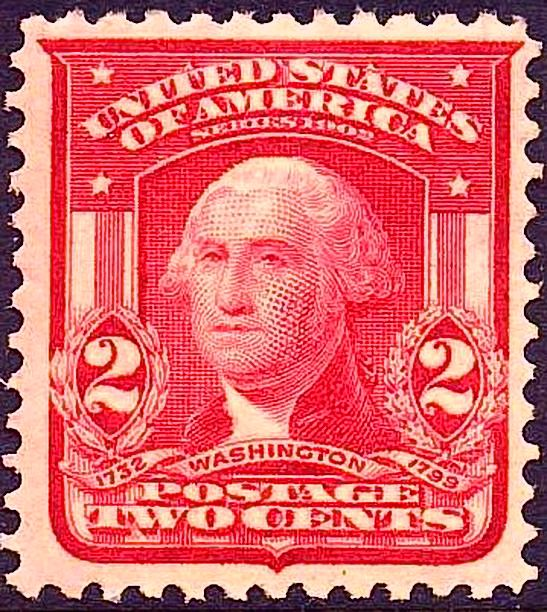
Issue of 1903

- On November 12, 1903, because of public dissatisfaction with the 1903 2-cent Washington "Flag" stamp, the Post Office issued a new 2-cent stamp featuring Washington's portrait within a shield of stars and stripes. Often referred to as the 2-cent Washington "Shield" stamp, this issue was released on November 12, 1903. Along with the shield background, the left numeral is enclosed with laurel leaves while the number on the right is surrounded with oak leaves, symbolizing Washington's role as president in peace time and as general in times of war. Unlike the first 2¢ stamp of 1903, this issue was designed by Clair Aubrey Huston from a painting by Gilbert Stuart. The engraving of Washington was done by George F. C. Smillie. The Washington "Shield" stamp is recognized for its many shade varieties, as collectors have distinguished over a hundred shades of this particular issue.

=== Washington–Franklin Issues ===
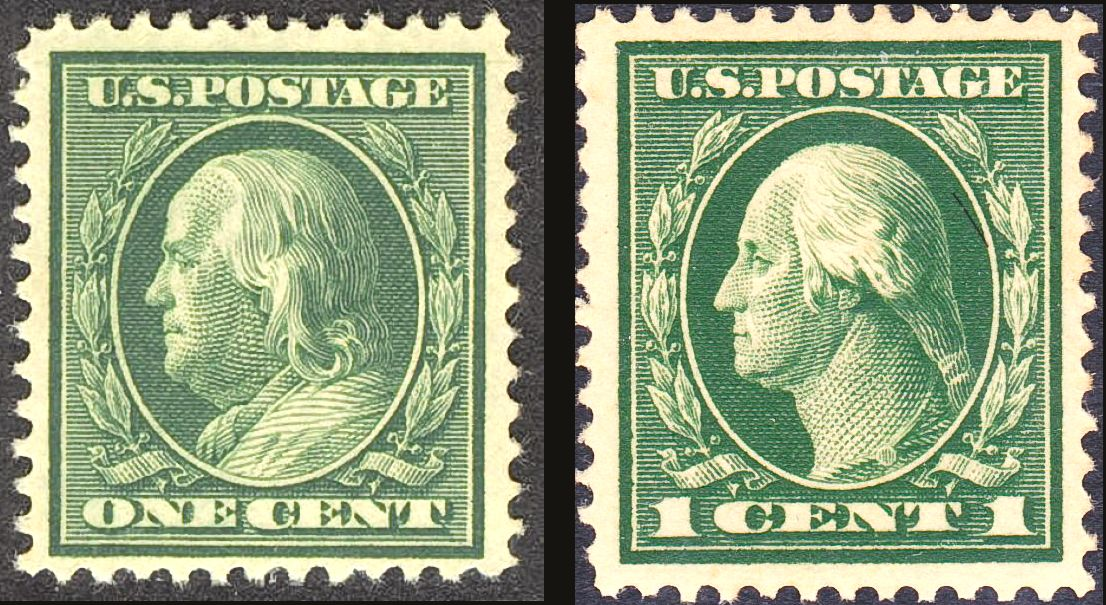
The Washington – Franklin Issue

The Washington–Franklin Issues were unique in the sense that these subjects were the only ones found on definitive stamps for more than a decade. Beginning in 1908 the Washington–Franklin definitive stamps were issued over a twelve-year period in denominations ranging from one cent to five dollars, with different colors for each denomination, all with the same engraved profile of Washington or Franklin. While both Washington and Franklin occur on the 1-cent values, both in green, only one of them appears in a given series (Franklin on the issues until 1912), while the same Washington image graced the remaining eleven denominations, which ranged from two cents to one dollar. In later issues, Washington was present only on the seven denominations between one cent and seven cents, and all the higher values were assigned to Franklin. The engraving of Washington was modeled after a bust by the sculptor Jean Antoine Houdon. The few examples exhibited here are largely representative of this greater series. Franklin is displayed once here for general reference to the Washington–Franklin issues.

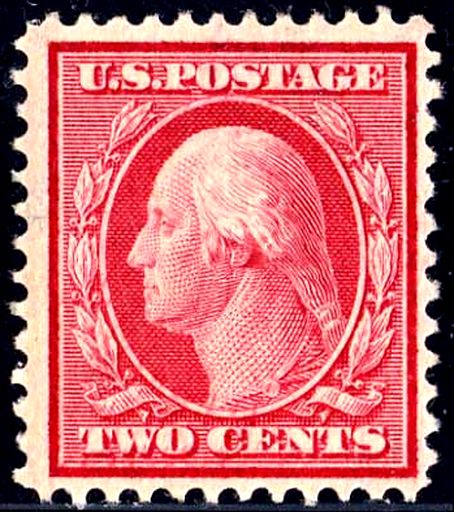
Issue of 1908

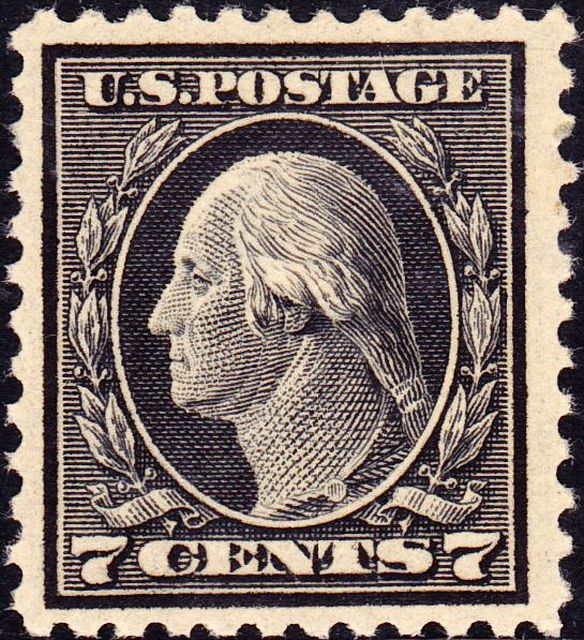
Issue of 1917

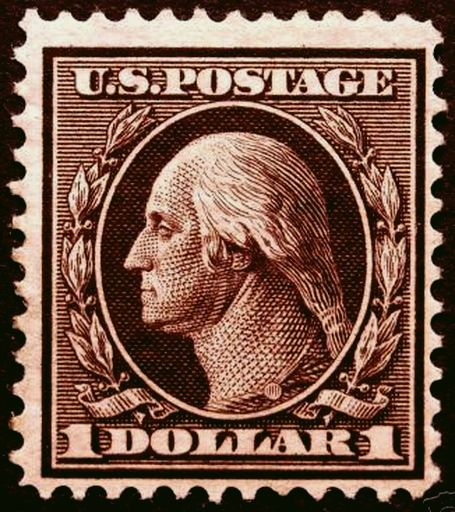
Issue of 1909

- On January 29, 1909, the Post Office issued the 1-dollar Washington Head stamp. It was the last of the first issue of Washington–Franklin stamps to appear. The stamp remained on sale at Post Offices for more than three years before being replaced by a Franklin head 1-dollar stamp in 1912. The one-dollar stamp is the highest denomination on which Washington appears in this series. Franklin is honored on the two- and five-dollar denominations.

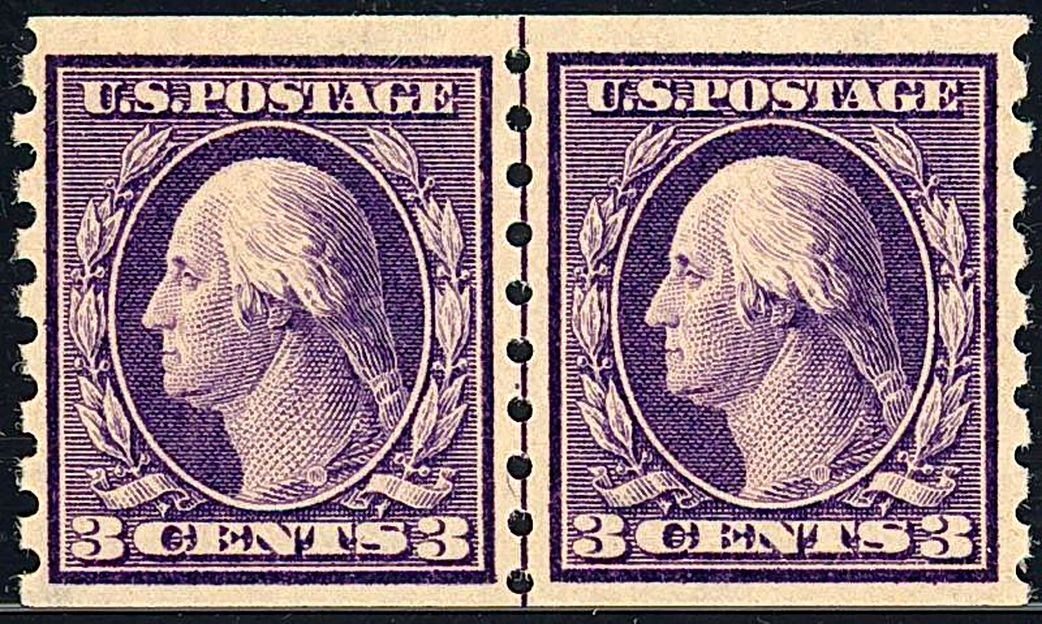
Washington on coil stamps issue of 1911

The various denominations found on postage for a given year issue can be viewed on the
Washington–Franklin issues chart

=== Washington on commemorative issues ===
Until the end of World War I, the Post Office, as a rule, issued commemorative stamps for only one reason: to promote a significant national exposition mounted by a U.S. city (the solitary exception to this practice was the Lincoln Memorial issue of 1909). The limited range of stamp subjects suitable to these trade fairs left no room for Washington's image on such commemoratives – even though he was the central subject of U.S. definitive stamps during these years. It was only after this restriction had been abandoned, in 1925, that Washington first appeared on a commemorative issue. This was twenty-one years after the Louisiana Purchase Exposition series, which had included the first three American commemoratives to honor specific presidents: Thomas Jefferson, James Monroe and William McKinley.

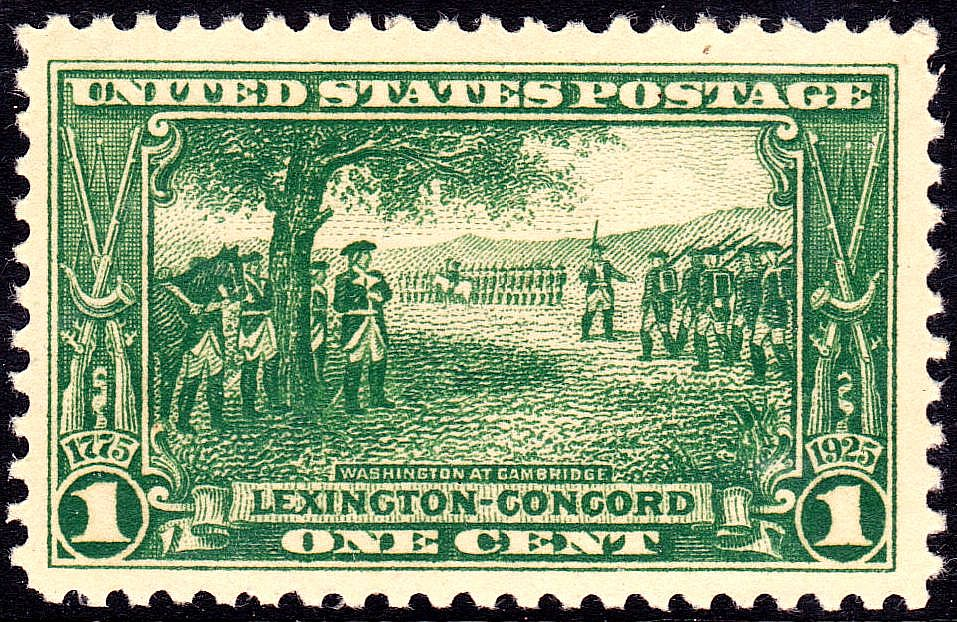
Washington at Cambridge Issue of 1925

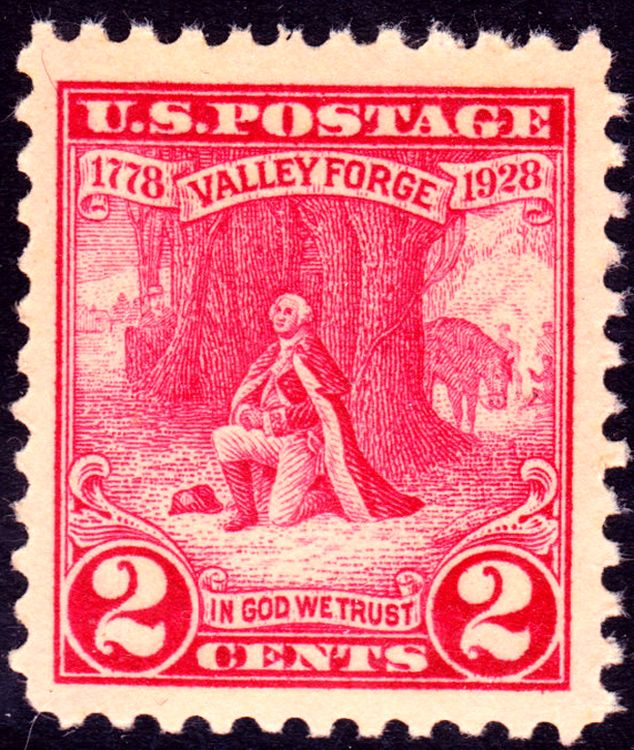
Washington at Prayer Issue of 1928

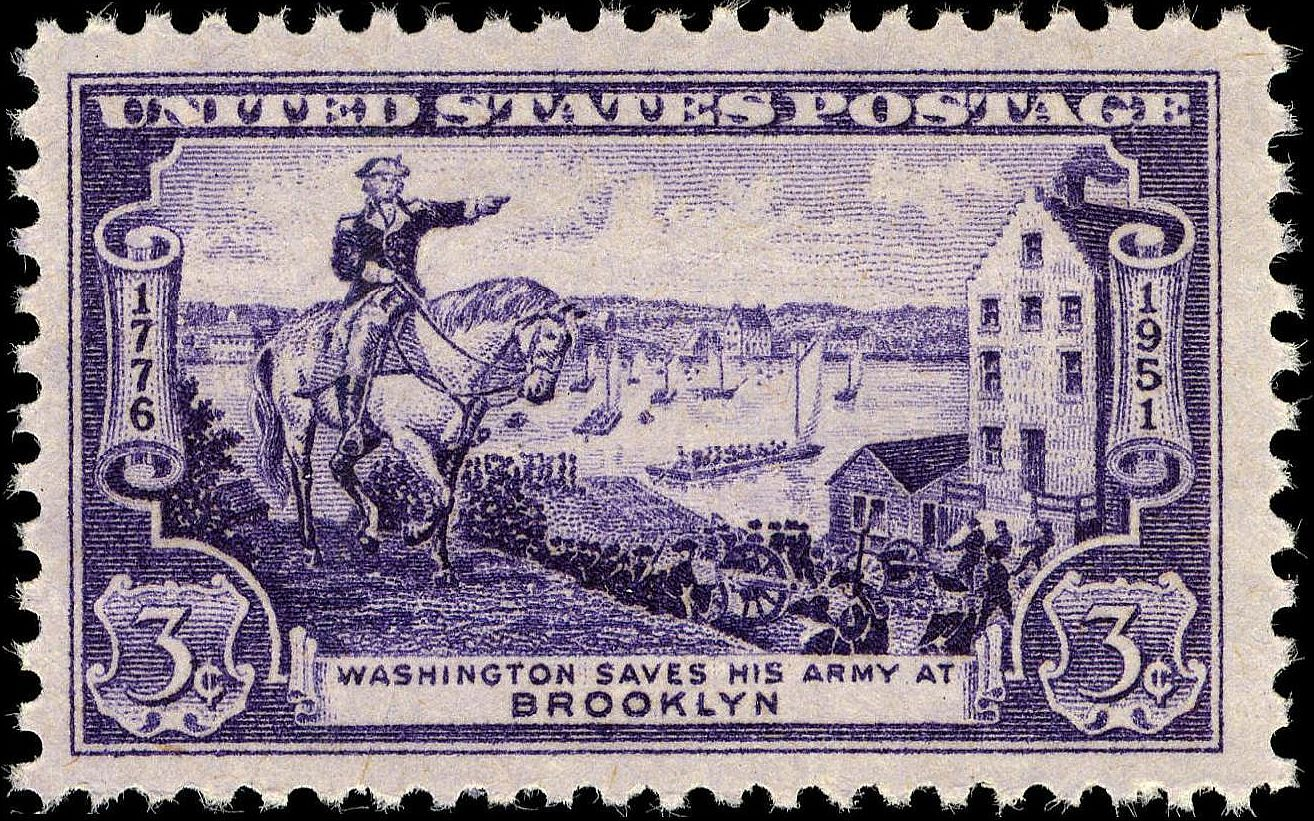
Washington at Brooklyn Issue of 1951

- On the 1-cent stamp portraying the Lexington – Concord issue of 1925, Washington is shown leading the Massachusetts Militia at Cambridge against General Gage and the British regulars. This series was the first of many commemoratives celebrating the 150th anniversary of important events of the American Revolution. Like all issues of this period, this stamp was produced by the Bureau of Engraving and Printing.

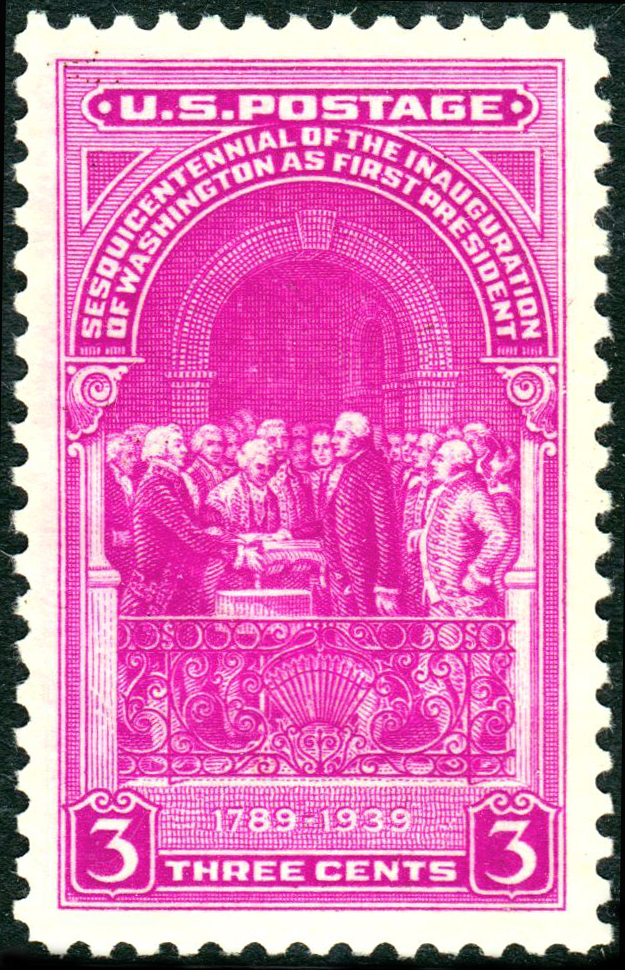
Washington takes Oath Issue of 1939

- This 2-cent red postage stamp was issued on May 26, 1928. This commemorative honored the 150th anniversary of George Washington at Valley Forge and depicts him kneeling in prayer before the battle.
- The Post Office issued a 3-cent commemorative stamp, on December 10, 1951, at Brooklyn, New York, to commemorate the 175th anniversary of the Battle of Brooklyn. The stamp portrays the evacuation of General Washington's troops from Brooklyn at the site of the Fulton Ferry House, with an accurate depiction of the house and the flat-bottomed ferries used to cross the East River.
- On April 30, 1789, President Washington took the oath of office of the president of the United States. On the 150th anniversary of his inauguration, April 30, 1939, the Post Office issued a 3¢ commemorative stamp celebrating this event. The engraving depicts Washington standing on the balcony of the Federal Hall in New York reciting the oath of office.

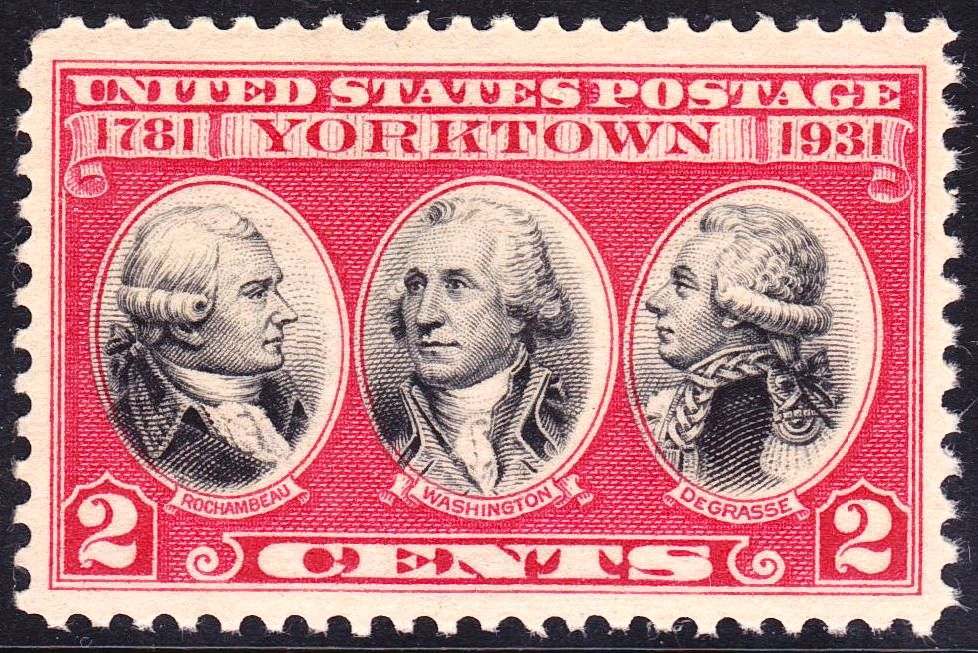
Battle of Yorktown Issue of 1931

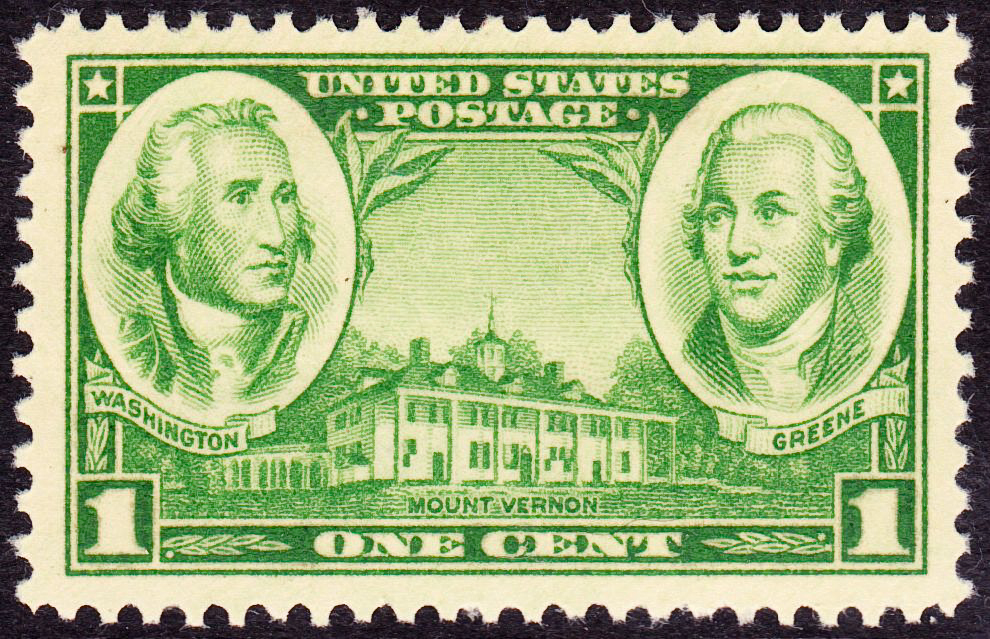
Washington Greene Issue of 1937

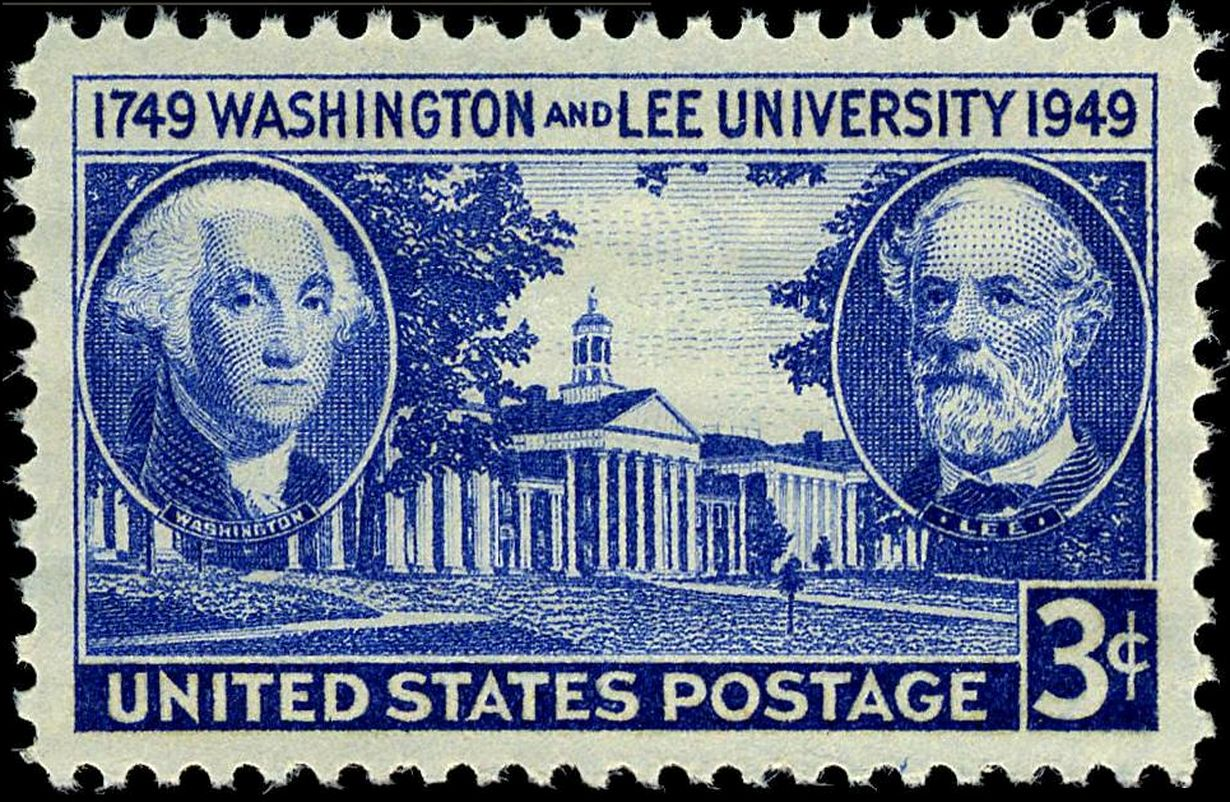
Washington, Lee & University Issue of 1949

- The 2-cent stamp issued on October 19, 1931, marked the 150th anniversary of the Battle of Yorktown (1781). This issue depicts Washington with Count de Rochambeau and Count de Grasse at his right and left, leaders of the French forces that aided in the victory of the American Revolution.

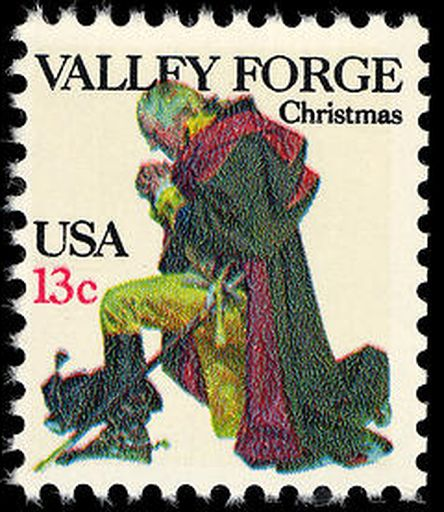
Christmas Issue, 1977

- The 1-cent Army Issue of December 15, 1936, features George Washington's home at Mount Vernon as its central design. Portraits of Washington and Nathanael Greene appear on either side of the image of Mount Vernon. Greene was one of Washington's most valued generals in the Revolutionary War.
- The 13-cent stamp Christmas Issue commemorates the 200th anniversary of Washington's army at Valley Forge, and was based on the J. C. Leyendecker painting George Washington at Valley Forge. Leyendecker's painting first appeared on the cover of the Saturday Evening Post on February 23, 1935. The stamp was designed by Steven Dohanos. The stamp was first available on October 21, 1977, at Valley Forge, Pennsylvania.

=== 1932 Washington Bicentennial ===
On January 1, 1932, in celebration of the 200th anniversary of George Washington's birth, the U.S. Post Office released its Washington Bicentennial Issue, a series of twelve postage stamps each with a different portrait of Washington. Each engraved portrayal was modeled from a different painting by an early American artist and the images present Washington at different periods in his life. Engravings of Washington often depict his profile. In the 1932 Bicentennial anniversary series there are two issues that show Washington in profile, one facing left, the other facing right. Information regarding quantities issued can be found on the Washington Bicentennial Issue page.

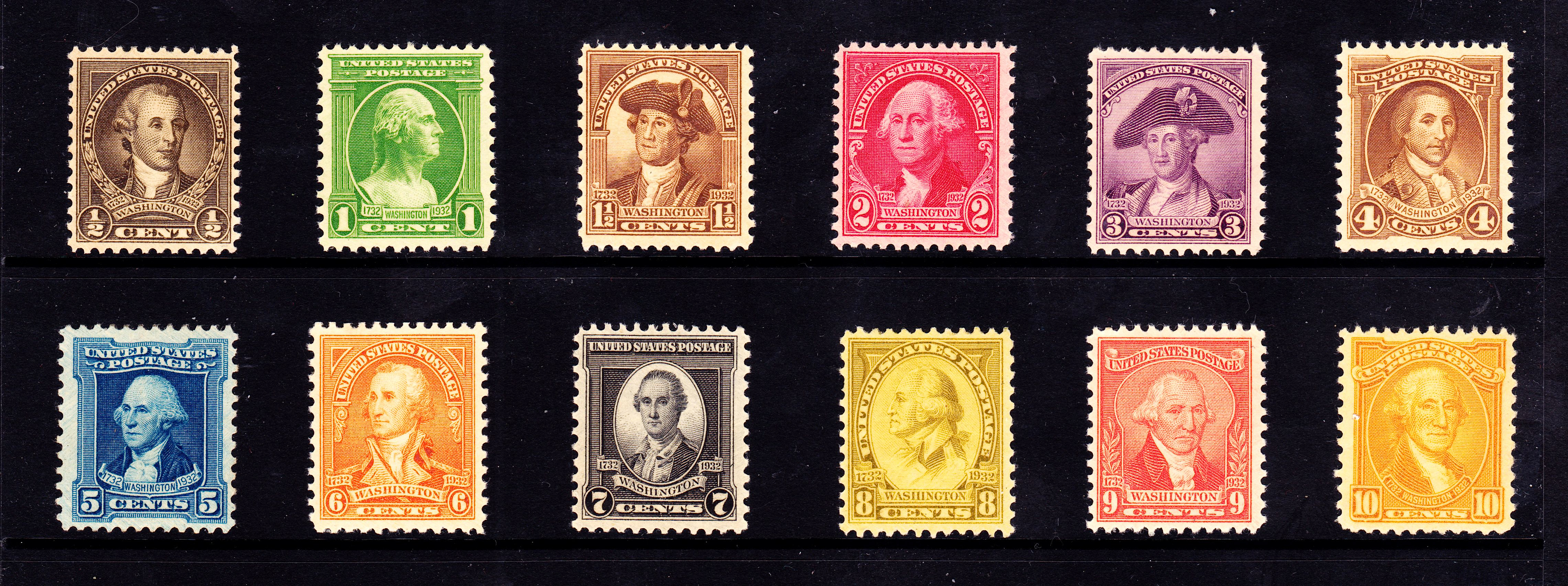
Washington Bicentennial issue of 1932

The Washington Bicentennial issues of 1932 are the first commemorative postage stamps ever issued by the Post Office that honor and depict George Washington by himself, and not in conjunction with other people, places, or events as is the case with the three commemoratives with Washington's image issued before 1932. There were 4.2 billion copies produced of the 2-cent Washington value in this series, a total that remains the largest stamp printing of a single issue ever to occur in U.S. postal history.

=== Washington issues, middle 20th century ===
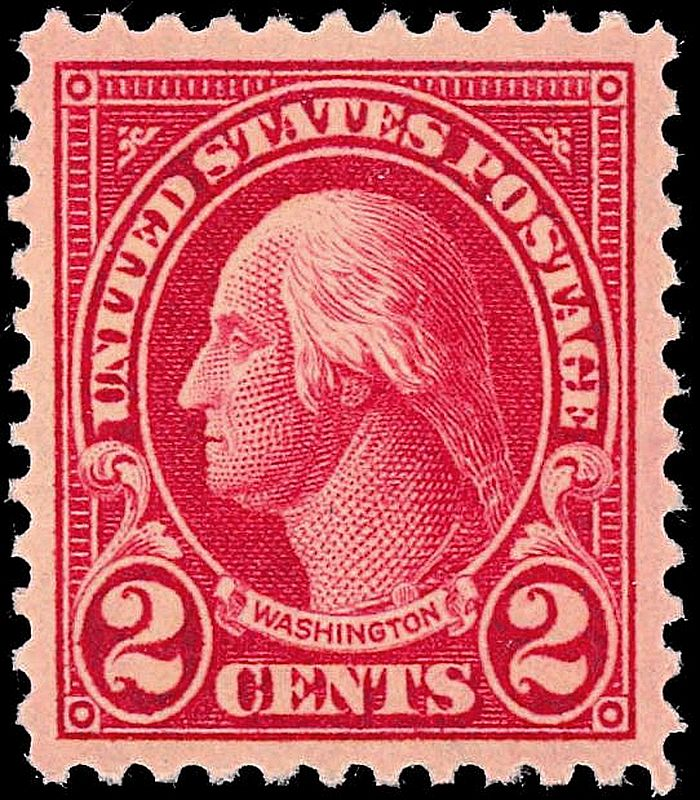
Issue of 1923

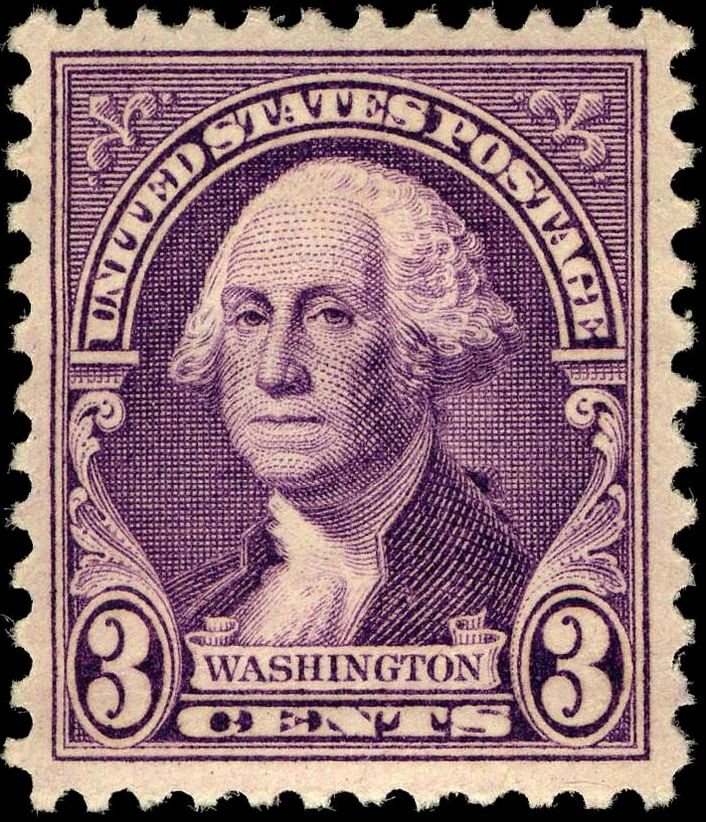
Issue of 1932

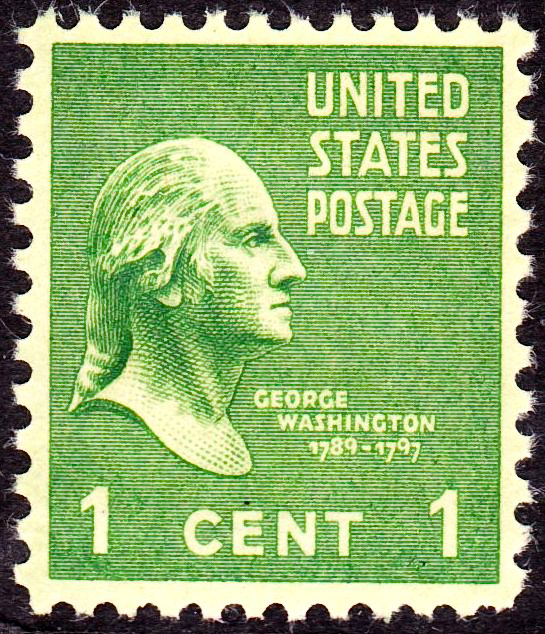
Issue of 1938

- On January 15, 1923, the Post Office issued another 2¢ red Washington postage stamp as part of its new definitive series, thus continuing the tradition of honoring Washington on everyday-use postage. An existing engraving of Washington made for use on the Washington–Franklin issue was used. That engraving, done by Marcus Baldwin, was modeled from a bust made by Clark Mills in 1853, which, in turn, was a reproduction of a bust sculpted by Jean Antoine Houdon at Washington's Mount Vernon home in 1785. Clair Aubrey Huston designed the stamp's frame, which was engraved by Edward M. Hall and Joachim C. Benzing.
- After the increase of the normal letter rate from 2 cents to 3 cents was announced in 1932, the Post Office acted to ensure that public would not be deprived of a definitive Washington stamp for its daily correspondence, a tradition that dated back more than sixty years. Rather than converting the 1923 definitive stamp to the new rate, the Post Office redesigned the 2 cent Washington Bicentennial value as a 3 cent regular-issue stamp, removing the original design's most conspicuous commemorative feature: the birth- and death-date ribbons flanking the portrait. This issue appeared on June 15, 1932, three weeks before the rate increase went into effect.
- On April 25, 1938, the Post Office issued a green 1-cent George Washington stamp. It was the first stamp of the Presidential Issue of 1938, an issue that placed all of the deceased presidents in numerical order and thus represented a break with the long-standing tradition of reserving the normal letter-rate definitive stamp for Washington. Instead, this Washington issue saw postal duty carrying postcards and letters through the late 1950s. The 1938 Presidential Issue was Franklin Roosevelt's idea. An avid stamp collector, Roosevelt suggested a set of stamps that would pay tribute to the various past American presidents. In 1937, after much debate, a new definitive series was issued using Roosevelt's ideas. A national contest was held, with over 1200 entries submitted, the entry of a young New York City art student, Elaine Rawlinson, was chosen for the Washington stamp design.

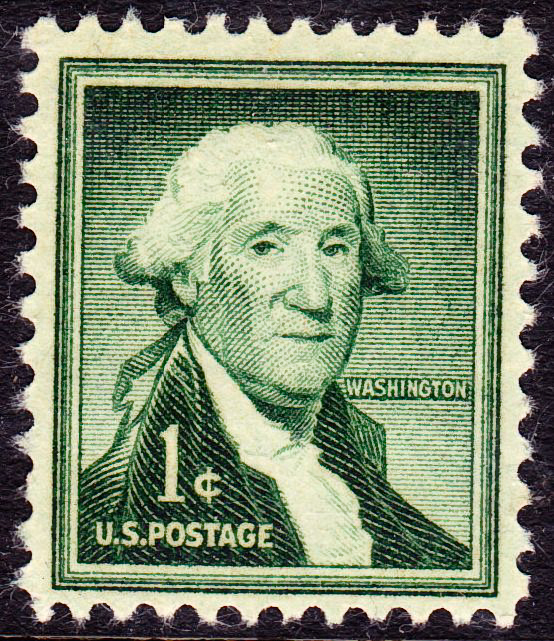
Issue of 1954

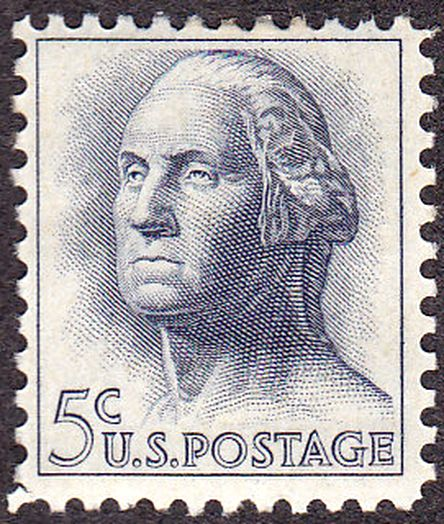
Issue of 1962

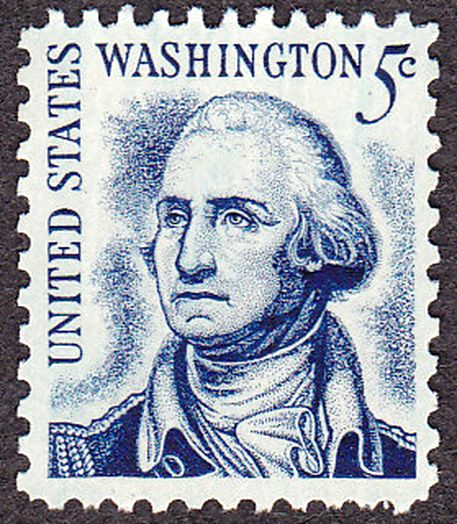
Issue of 1966

- The Post Office released the 1-cent Washington stamp on August 26, 1954, in Chicago, Illinois. The engraving of George Washington was modeled from a portrait by Gilbert Stuart (1755–1828). It was designed by Charles R. Chickering, who produced his own drawing from a photograph he obtained from the National Gallery. The portrait of Washington was engraved by Richard M. Bower of the Bureau of Engraving and Printing.
- On November 23, 1962, the Post Office issued the 5-cent Washington stamp, first issued through the New York, New York, post office. Designed by William K. Schrage, the engraving of Washington, like several other engravings of this president, is based on a bust of Washington sculpted in 1785 by Jean Houdon.
- On February 22, 1966, the Post Office issued the 5-cent blue Washington stamp. Bill Hyde designed the stamp after a portrait by Rembrandt Peale. Critics described Washington's appearance on this stamp as "pockmarked" and "unshaven", and a smoother-looking re-engraved version was issued on November 17, 1967.

=== Washington, recent issues ===
Issue of 1982

Issue of 2001

In recent years, Washington has appeared much less frequently on stamps than he did during the 19th and early 20th centuries.

- On the 250th anniversary of George Washington's birth, a 20-cent commemorative stamp was issued February 22, 1982, at Mount Vernon, Virginia. The First Day of Issue ceremony was held in the Mount Vernon Inn. The designer, Mark English, of Kansas City, Missouri, based his design on a stylistic portrait depicting the distinctive Washington profile.
- The Postal Service issued a stamp on April 16, 1984, commemorating the 50th anniversary of the National Archives, and including silhouettes of Washington and Abraham Lincoln in the design.
- Washington also appears on the AMERIPEX Presidential issue of 1986.
- On August 19, 1994, the U.S. Postal Service issued a 5-dollar Washington-Jackson stamp in Pittsburgh, Pennsylvania, at the American Philatelic Society's annual stamp exposition. The stamp was modeled after a design created in 1869 by the National Bank Note Company, which was originally prepared but never was used for the 1869 postage series. The central image or vignette features a portrait of George Washington and Andrew Jackson. The portrayals of Washington and Jackson were engraved through the intaglio process by Stamp Venturers, Inc., and issued in small sheets of twenty stamps.
- In 2001, Washington appeared on a red-brown 20-cent definitive stamp, and the same Washington image was used that year for a 23-cent definitive stamp in dark green.
- The original Purple Heart, designated as the Badge of Military Merit, was established by George Washington, then the commander-in-chief of the Continental Army, on August 7, 1782. The actual order includes the phrase, "Let it be known that he who wears the military order of the purple heart has given of his blood in the defense of his homeland and shall forever be revered by his fellow countrymen Washington's profile adorns the modern Purple Heart medal, and the U.S. postage Purple Heart issue honors them both. Designed by Carl T. Herrman of Carlsbad, California, the stamp depicts an image of the Purple Heart medal with Washington in profile. The Purple Heart stamp was first issued in 2003 with a 37-cent denomination. It was later reissued in 2006 as a 39-cent stamp, in 2007 as a 41-cent stamp, in 2008 as a 42-cent stamp, and on April 28, 2009, as a 44-cent stamp. Another Purple Heart stamp was issued on May 5, 2011, as a "forever" stamp.
- On April 11, 2011, the Postal Service issued a 20-cent stamp bearing a color reproduction of the famous Washington portrait by Gilbert Stuart.

== John Adams ==
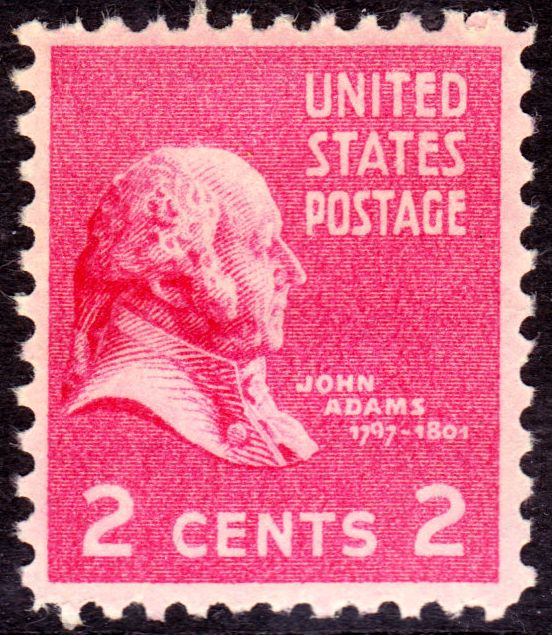
Issue of 1938

John Adams (October 30, 1735 – July 4, 1826) was the second president of the United States, serving from 1797 to 1801.

- The engraved portrayal of Adams (1735–1826) appears on the 2-cent value of the Presidential Issue, issued on June 3, 1938. Daniel Chester French's marble 1889 bust of Adams displayed in the U.S. Capitol's Senate Gallery was the model used for the engraving of Adams.
- Adams also appears on the AMERIPEX Presidential issue of 1986.

== Thomas Jefferson ==
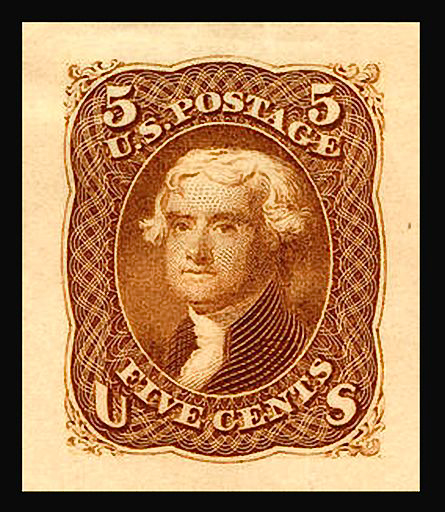
Jefferson Die Proof 1861

Thomas Jefferson (April 13, 1743 – July 4, 1826) was the third president of the United States, serving from 1801 to 1809.

Thomas Jefferson's likeness over the years has been finely depicted on the face of the various postage issues that honored him. The first issue to depict Jefferson was issued in 1856, (displayed above) nine years after the Post Office issued its first two stamps of Washington and Franklin in 1847. (Before this time hand-stamps were used to mark and confirm payment of postage.) Almost as popular and famous as George Washington, Jefferson appears comparatively less often on U.S. postage issues, and unlike Washington and Franklin, appears on just two commemorative issues, one in 1904, displayed below, the other on the AMERIPEX presidential issue of 1986. His remaining depictions are confined to regular issues.

- On August 19, 1861, while the American Civil War was wreaking havoc across Virginia and elsewhere, the Post Office issued a 5-cent buff (yellow-brown) colored stamp that honored Thomas Jefferson. The engraving used to produce the image was modeled after a portrait by Gilbert Stuart. The engraver for this issue was William Marshall, who also engraved Washington's image for several issues of this period. This Jefferson issue occurs in several distinct shades of brown. This image was again reprinted on February 3, 1863, in a dark brown color. Also in 1861, Jefferson became the first U.S. president to appear on a Confederate stamp: a 10¢ value in blue, reissued in 1862 with its color changed to rose-pink.

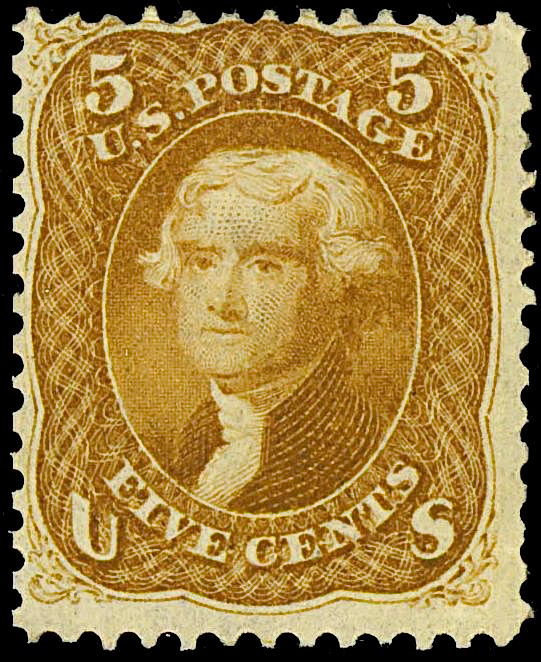
Issue of 1861

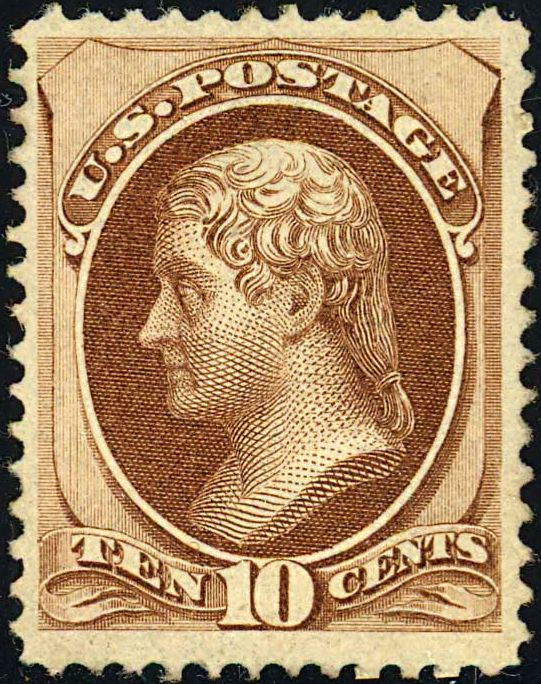
Issue of 1870

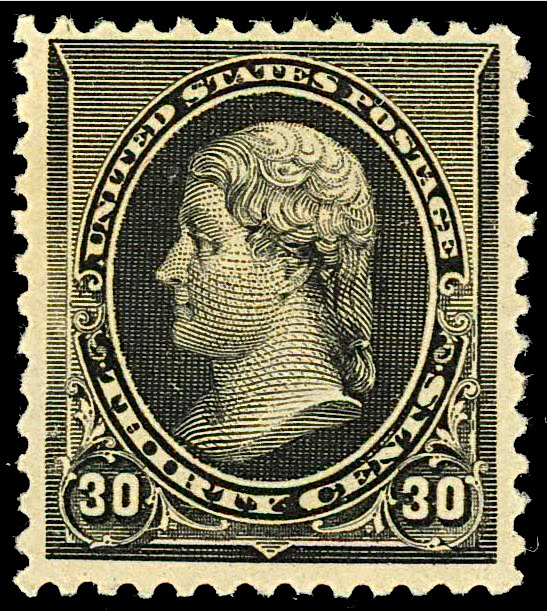
Issue of 1890

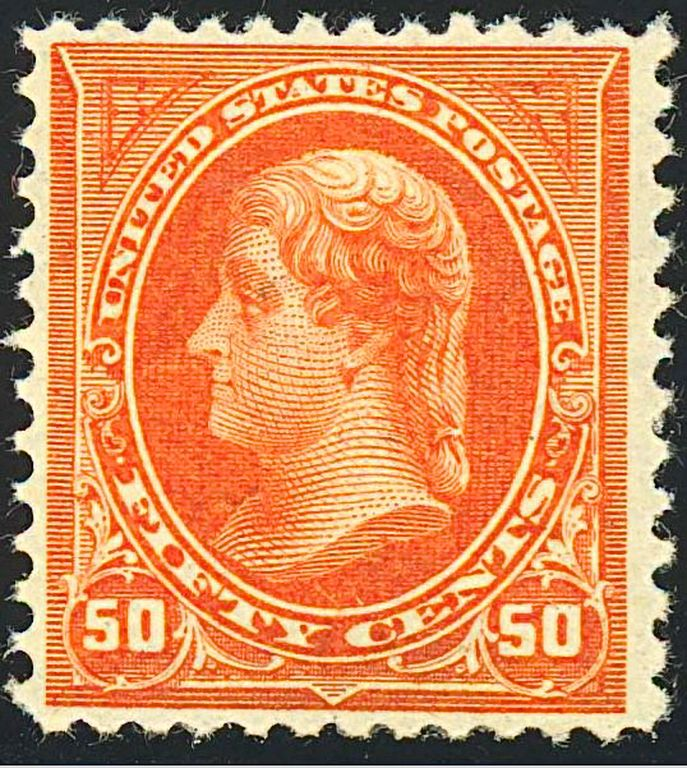
Issue of 1894

- On April 12, 1870, the third stamp issued by the Post Office to honor Thomas Jefferson was released. The 10¢ stamp issue was printed by the National Bank Note Company. In 1859 the sculptor Hiram Powers was commissioned by the US government to create two life-size marble statues to be placed in the United States Capitol building. One was of Benjamin Franklin; the other was of Thomas Jefferson, completed in 1863. This was the image Powers used to model his engraving of Jefferson on the 10¢ issue of 1870.
- On February 22, 1890, the Post Office released a 30¢ postage stamp that once again honored Thomas Jefferson. The engraver and artist Alfred Jones (1819–1900) created the image of Jefferson that appears on the issue. Jones was noted for his engraved portraits and historic scenes during his time at American Bank Note Company.
- On November 1, 1894, the first 50¢ definitive Postage stamp was issued. It appeared in the first definitive series printed by the Bureau of Engraving and Printing. Its design is based on that of the 30¢ black issue of 1890, and employs the same engraved image of Thomas Jefferson by Alfred Jones. While largely identical in design, it is readily distinguished by its orange color, and by the triangles in the upper corners.

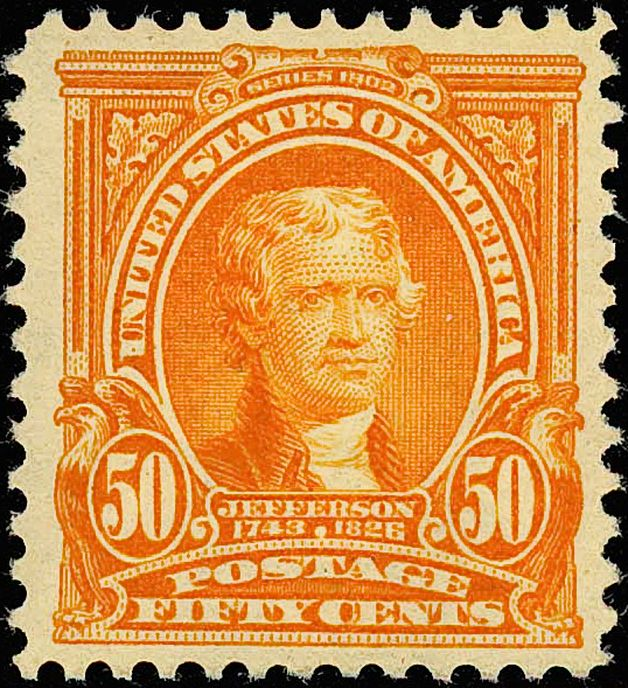
Issue of 1903

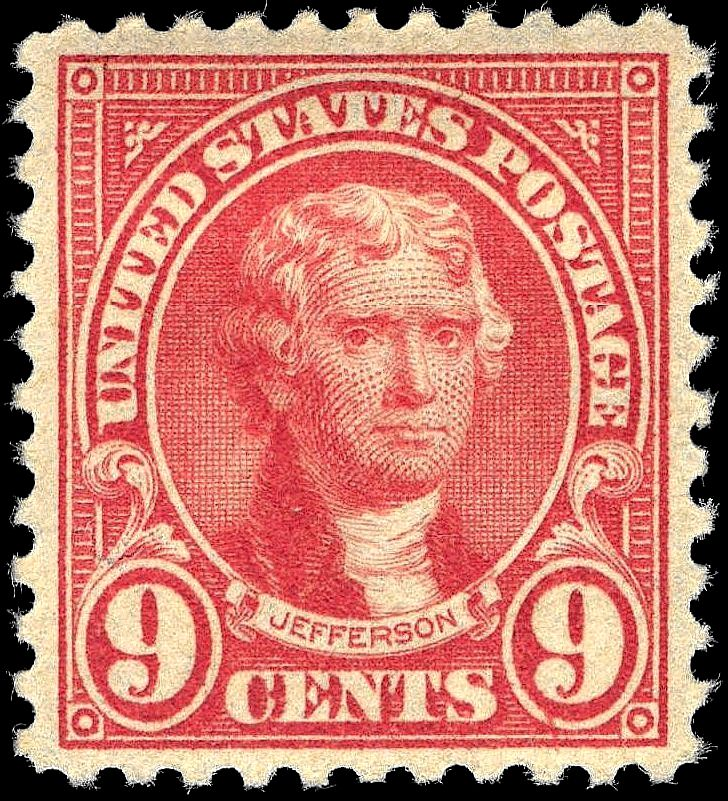
Issue of 1923

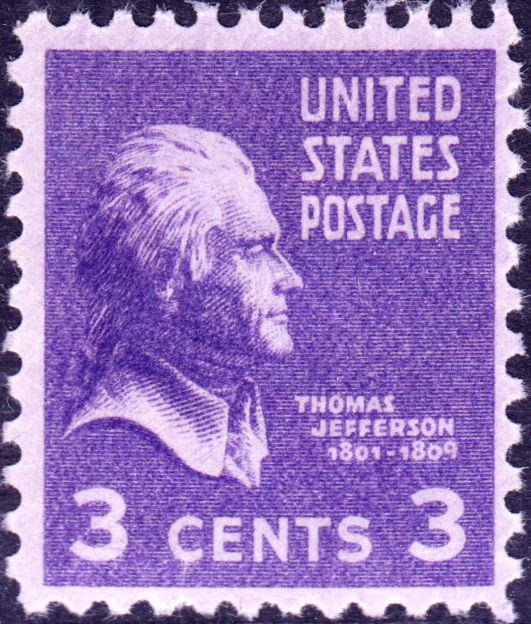
Issue of 1938

- The second 50-cent orange stamp depicting Thomas Jefferson was issued March 23, 1903. The stamp was designed by R. Ostrander Smith from the 1805 a portrait of Jefferson by Gilbert Stuart. Jefferson's portrait was engraved by George F. C. Smillie.
- Absent, of course, from the Washington–Franklin series, Jefferson returned to U.S. postage in the next definitive series (1923), depicted on a nine-cent stamp designed by Clair Aubrey Huston. Huston reused George F. C. Simille's engraving of Jefferson, which had appeared on the 2-cent value of the 1904 Louisiana Purchase Exposition Series. (The model for Simille's engraving was a portrait of Jefferson painted by Gilbert Stuart in 1805). Simille's engraving was transferred to a new die and restored by Bureau engravers John Eissler and Leo Kauffmann for use on the 1923 Jefferson issue.
- Jefferson appears on the 3-cent Presidential issue of 1938, which satisfied the normal letter rate. This was the first definitive U.S. series designed to place any president other than Washington on the normal-letter denomination.

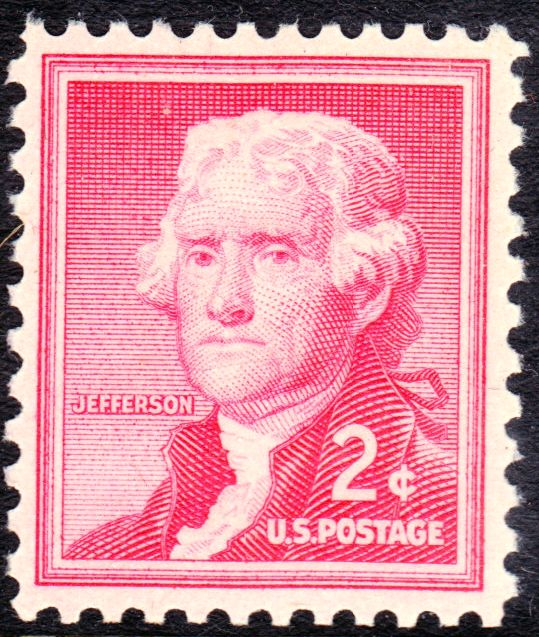
Issue of 1954

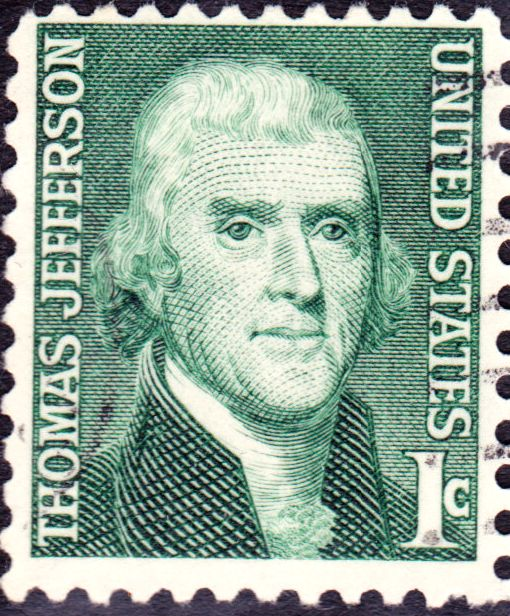
Issue of 1968

- On September 15, 1954, the 2-cent Jefferson stamp from the Liberty Issue was issued in San Francisco, California. The postcard rate went to 2 cents on the day of this issue was released so the stamp was very common among the mail for that reason. The engraving of Jefferson was taken from a portrait by Gilbert Stuart which hangs in the Bowdoin College Museum of Art in Brunswick, Maine.
- The 1-cent green stamp was issued January 12, 1968, at Jeffersonville, Indiana. The issue was designed by Robert Geissmann, modeled after an 1800 portrait of Jefferson by Rembrandt Peale which now hangs in the Blue Room of the White House. Edward R. Felver crafted the engraving of Jefferson.
- The U.S. Postal Service issued the 29-cent Thomas Jefferson definitive stamp on April 13, 1993, in Charlottesville, Virginia. The stamp engraving features a portrait of Jefferson and is part of the Great Americans series. The stamp issue was designed by Christopher Calle while the die for the stamp was engraved by Stamp Venturers, Inc.

=== Jefferson on commemorative issue ===
Thomas Jefferson has only appeared on two U.S. commemorative issues, the first of which was released in 1904 and was one of the first three commemorative issues ever to honor U.S. presidents (along with Monroe and McKinley).

The first presidential commemorative

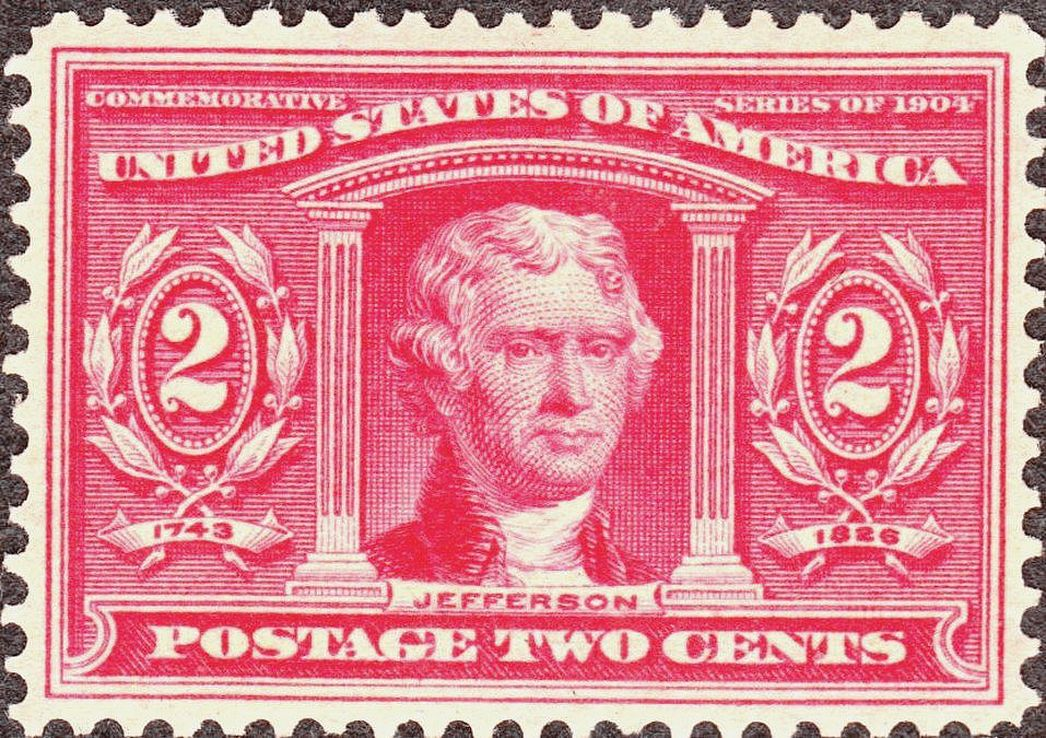
Classic engraving of Jefferson Louisiana Purchase Exposition Issue of 1904.

- The first commemorative stamp depicting Jefferson was the 2-cent Louisiana Purchase Exposition issue of 1904. (By contrast, although Washington had appeared on numerous definitive stamps, he never appeared on a commemorative stamp until 21 years later, when the Post Office portrayed him on its Lexington-Concord issue of 1925.)
- The only other issue to honor Jefferson to date was a 22-cent commemorative AMERIPEX presidential issue released in 1986.

== James Madison ==
James Madison was the fourth president of the United States, served from 1809 to 1817. Madison appears on three definitive issues.

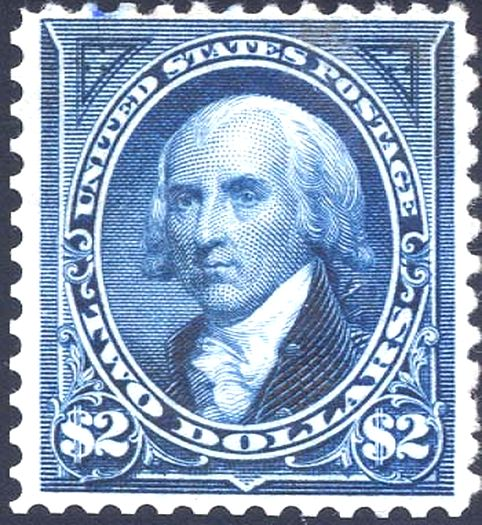
Issue of 1894

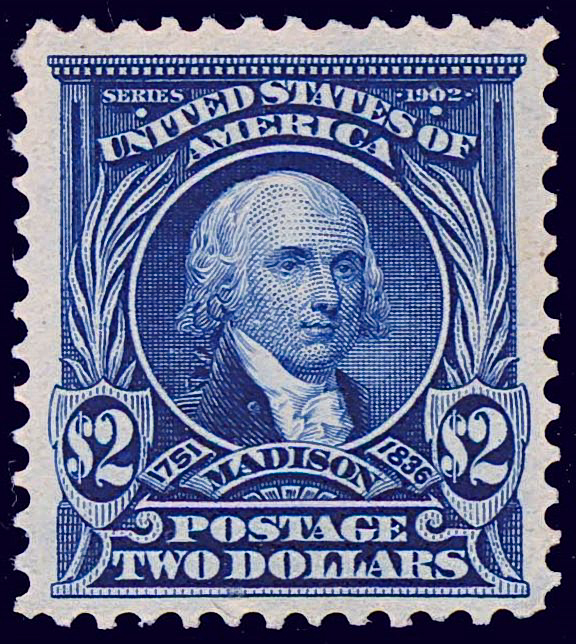
Issue of 1903

- On December 10, 1894, the Post Office issued a 2-dollar Madison stamp. The engraving of Madison was modeled after his portrayal by Gilbert Stuart, who painted a total of four portraits of the president. The painting used to model the engraving is now owned by the Colonial Williamsburg Association (In 1994, four images of this stamp appeared on a souvenir sheet commemorating the hundredth anniversary of stamp production by the Bureau of Engraving and Printing.)

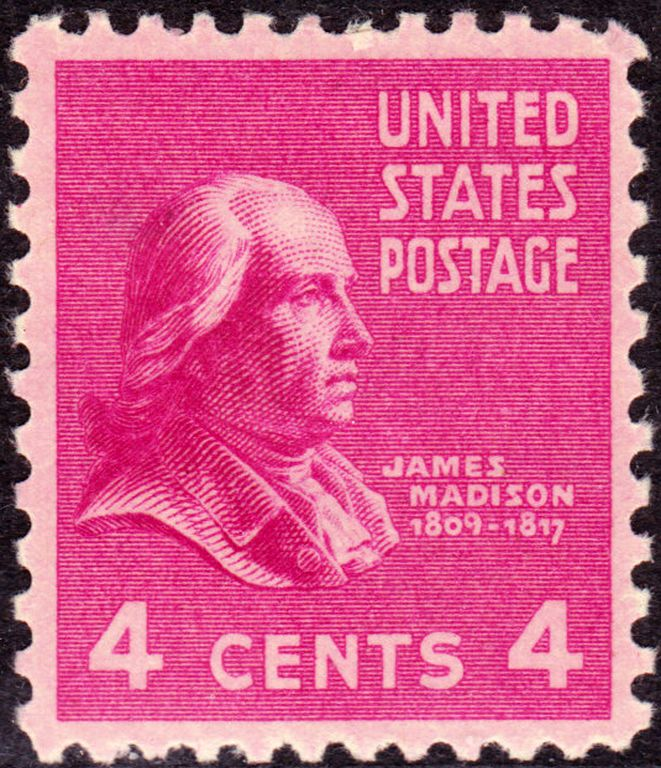
Issue of 1938

- The dark blue 2-dollar stamp was issued June 5, 1903. The stamp image was designed by R. Ostrander Smith from a painting by an unknown artist, and Madison's portrait was engraved by George F. C. Smillie. Both the 1894 and 1903 2-dollar stamps were often used by the Post Office for internal transferring of funds.
- The Post Office issued a 4¢ Madison stamp on July 1, 1938, part of the Presidential Issue that was issued that year. The engraving of Madison on this issue was modeled after a bust by Frederick William Sievers on display in the State Capitol building in Richmond, Virginia.

1st Madison Commemorative Issue of 2001

Despite having appeared on definitive stamps, Madison never appeared on a U.S. commemorative stamp until he was included along with the other past presidents on a 22-cent commemorative AMERIPEX presidential issue released in 1986.

In 2001, the Postal Service finally honored James Madison with a single commemorative stamp, issued for the 250th anniversary of his birth, first released in New York, N.Y., on October 18, 2001. The stamp was designed and illustrated by John Thompson.

== James Monroe ==
James Monroe (April 28, 1758 – July 4, 1831), was the fifth president of the United States, who served two terms from 1817 to 1825.

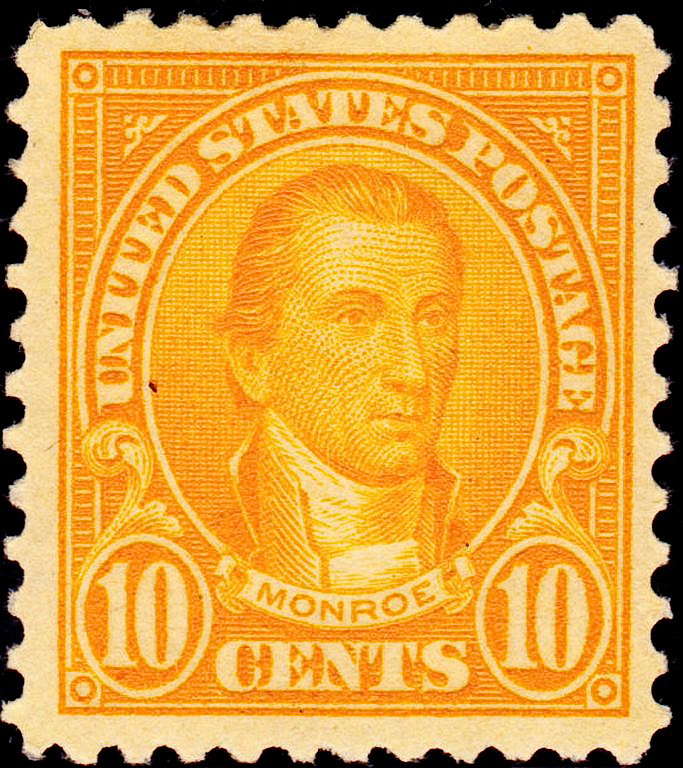
Issue of 1925

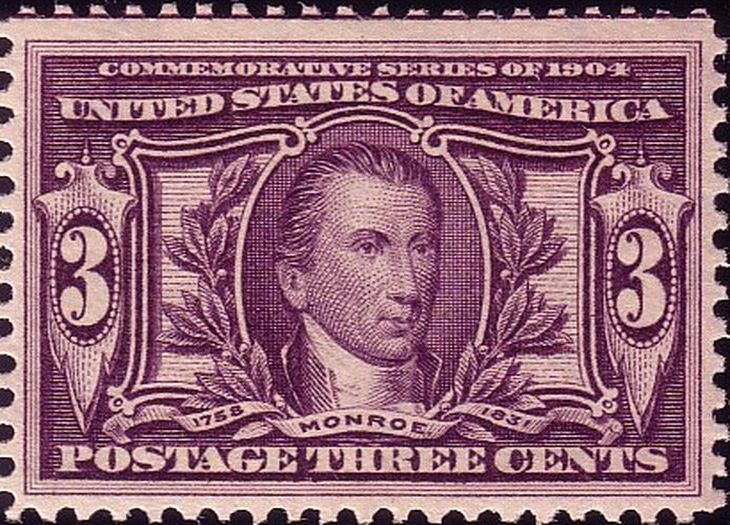
First Monroe Postage stamp Issue of 1904

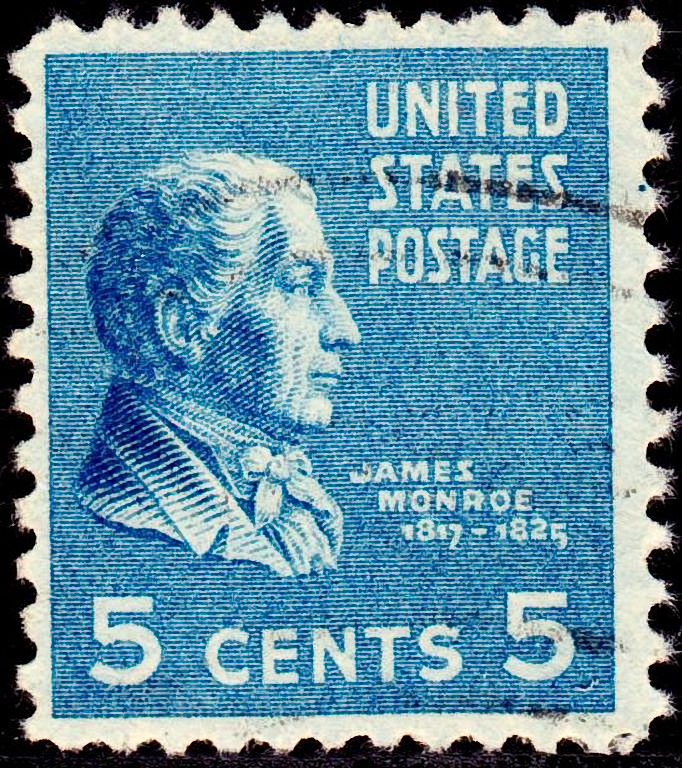
Issue of 1938

- The first U.S. postage stamp to honor Monroe was the Louisiana Purchase Expedition commemorative 3¢ issue of 1904. Monroe's image was engraved by George F.C. Simille, modeled after a painting by John Vanderlyn which now hangs in City Hall, New York City. The five stamps of this set -— three of which presented the first presidential images ever to appear on U.S. commemorative issues -— were sold only during the seven months of the Exposition.
- The 10¢ "orange" (yellow) regular issue was printed and issued in 1923, 1925 and 1927, and was the first definitive issue to honor Monroe. Clair Aubrey Huston designed the Monroe stamp, choosing the image of the president previously used on the 3-cent issue of the 1904 Louisiana Purchase Exposition Series. Edward J. Hein transferred George Simille's engraved portrait to a new die and restored it for the new stamp.
- The 5¢ Presidential issue of 1938 depicts Monroe in profile, as do all of the images of that series. The engraving of Monroe was modeled after a Congressional Medal designed by Moritz Fuerst and struck by the U.S. Mint.

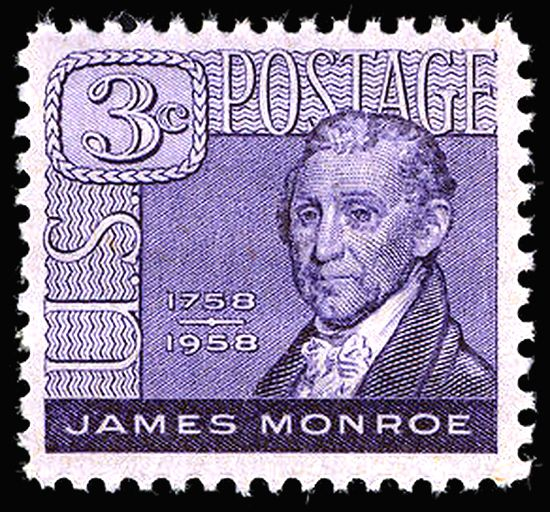
Issue of 1958

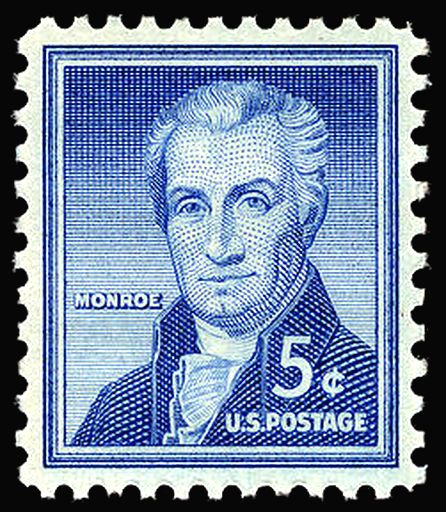
Issue of 1954

- On April 28, 1958, at Montross, Virginia, the Post Office issued a 3-cent stamp to commemorate the 200th anniversary of the birth of James Monroe. The issue was designed by Frank Conley and was modeled after a portrait of Monroe by Gilbert Stuart.
- The image of the 5¢ 1954 issue was modeled after a portrait by Rembrandt Peale displayed at James Monroe Law Office and Museum in Fredericksburg, Virginia, the building in which James Monroe practiced law.
- Monroe is honored on a 22-cent commemorative AMERIPEX presidential issue of 1986.

== John Quincy Adams ==
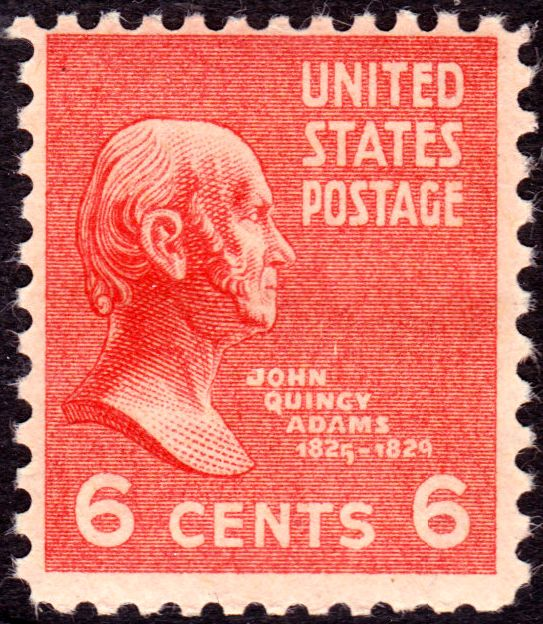
Issue of 1938

John Quincy Adams (July 11, 1767 – February 23, 1848) was the sixth president of the United States from 1825 to 1829. He has appeared on the following two U.S. postage stamps:

- The engraved image of Adams appears on the orange 6-cent denomination of the 1938 Presidential Series. The engraving was modeled after a bust of Adams displayed in the U.S. Capitol.
- The next postage stamp presenting Adams was part of the Ameripex '86 issue, which honored all past deceased American presidents.

== Andrew Jackson ==
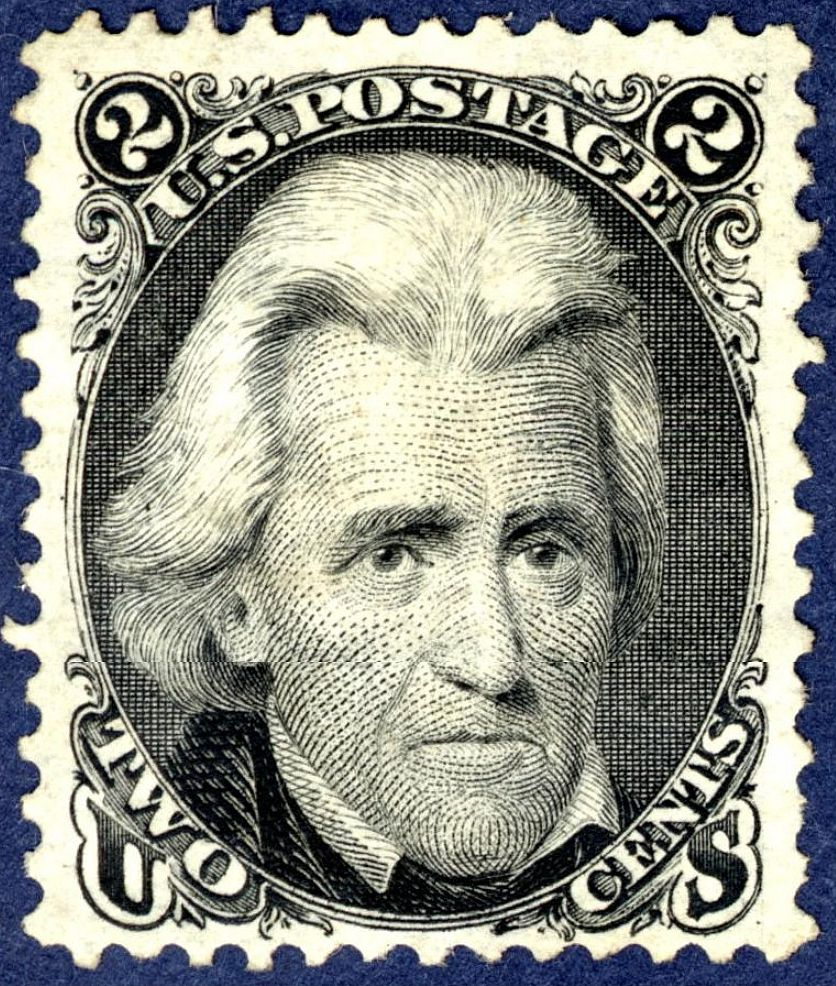
The first Jackson stamp, issued, July 1, 1863

Andrew Jackson, was the seventh president of the United States who served two terms from 1829 to 1837. He was the commander of the American forces at the Battle of New Orleans in 1815. Jackson died in 1845, and the Post Office first released a stamp in his honor 18 years after his death, with the issue of 1863 (displayed in First appearances) above). At that time, as aforesaid, he had already appeared on two different Confederate 2¢ stamps.

Regular issues of the 19th century

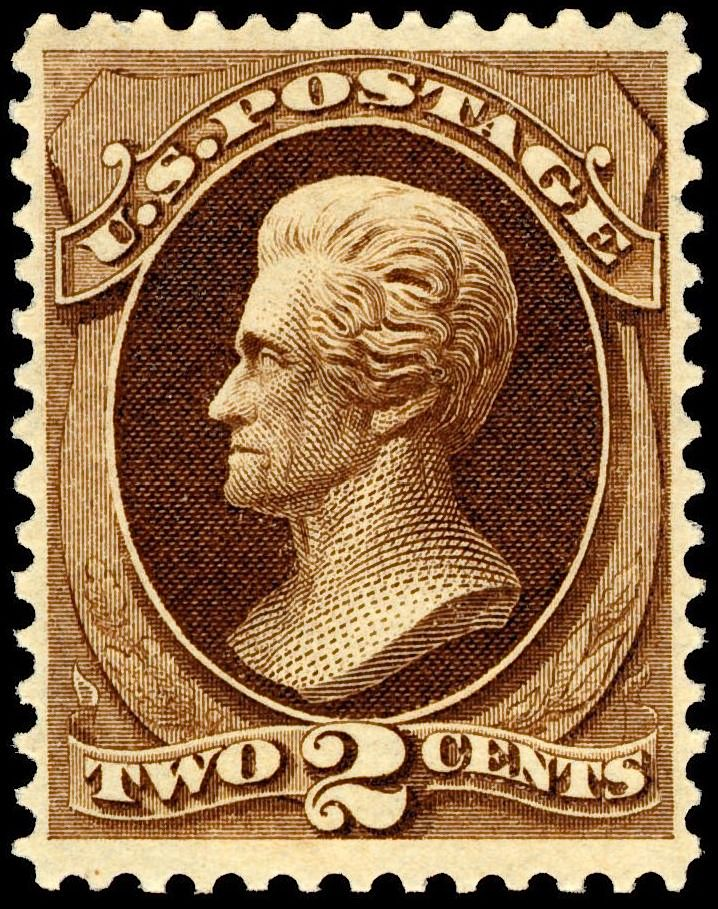
Issue of 1873

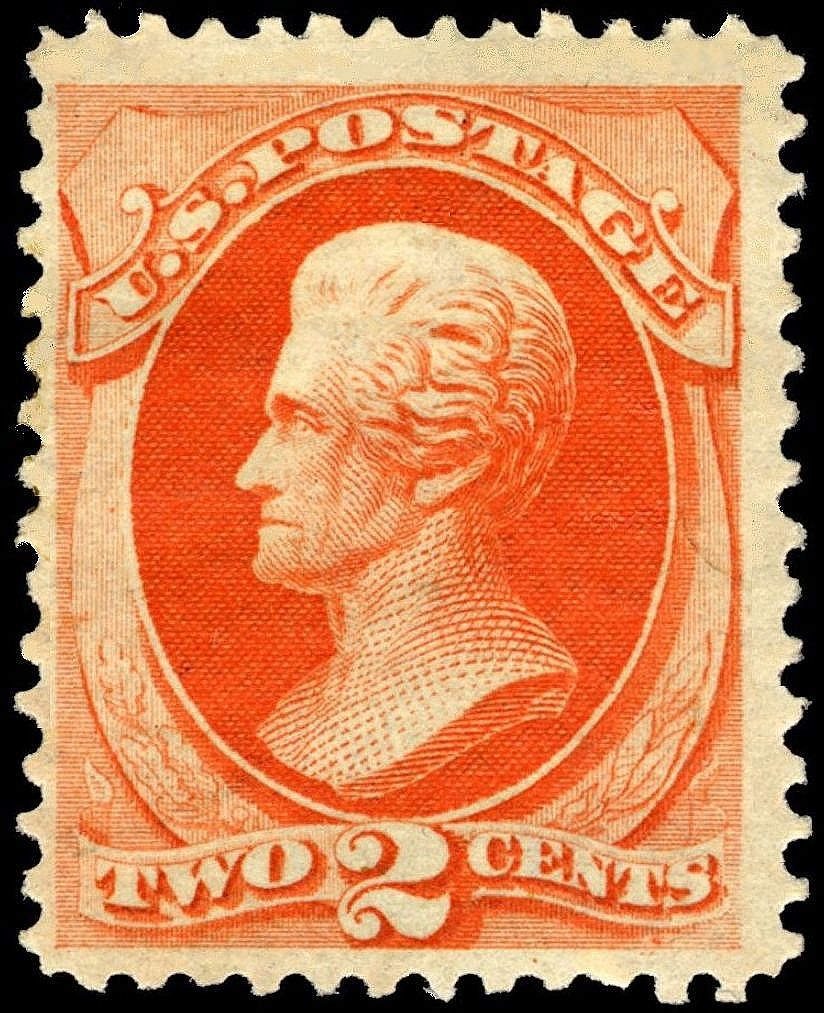
Issue of 1875

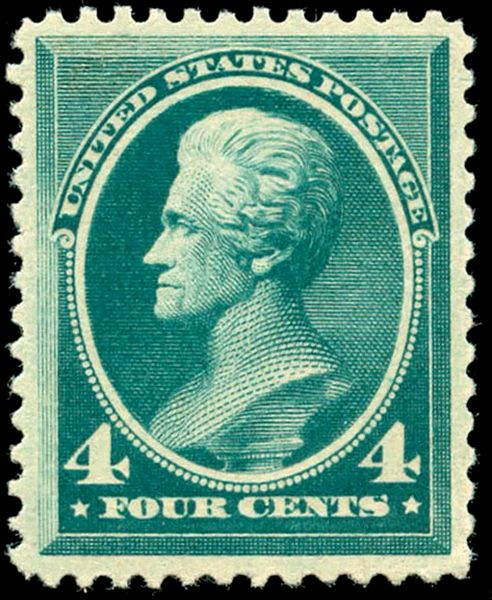
Issue of 1883

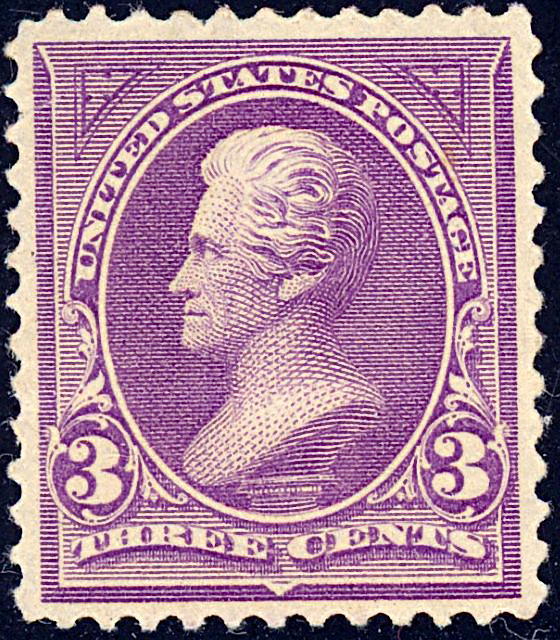
Issue of 1894

- Hiram Powers (1805–1873) was considered one of the greatest American-born neoclassical sculptors. In 1834, Andrew Jackson posed many times for Powers as he sculpted a bust of the president. The bust was completed in January 1835. Thirty-five years later, it inspired the image of the 2-cent Jackson stamp from the National Bank Note Company 1870–1871 Issue.
- The 3¢ issue of 1894 features an image of Jackson similar to those on the issues of 1873 and 1883, taken from a bust by Hiram Powers.

Regular issues of the 20th century

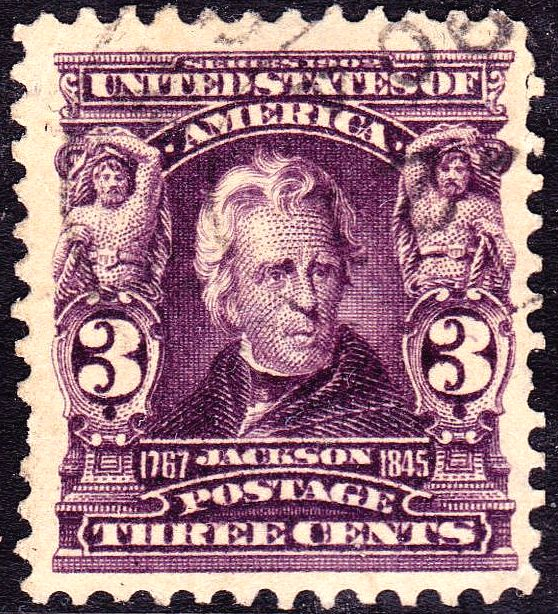
Issue of 1903

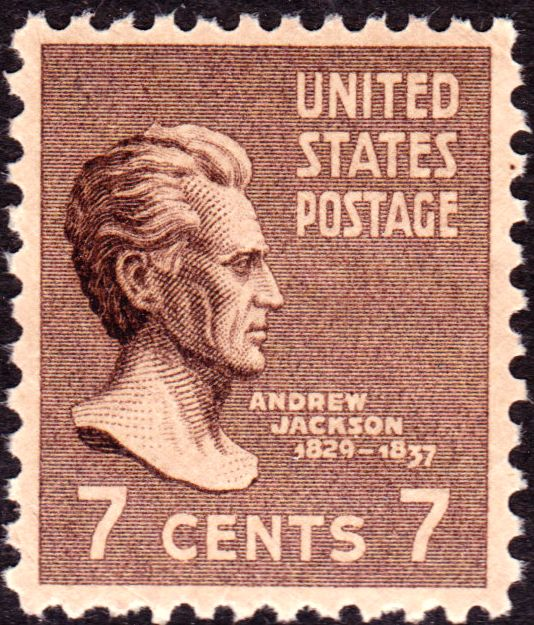
Issue of 1938

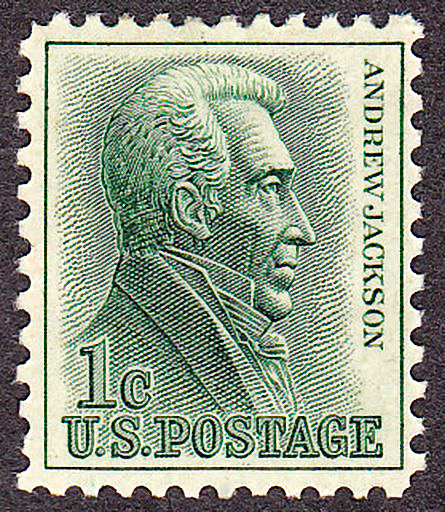
Issue of 1963

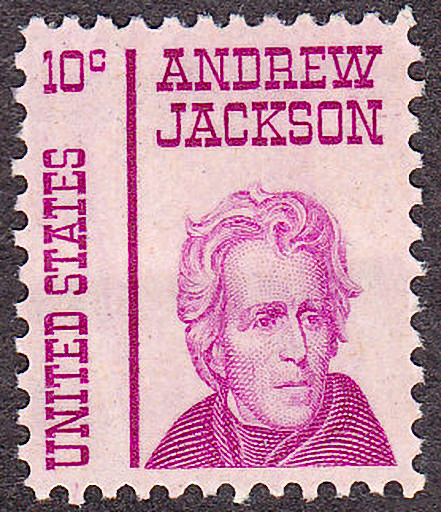
Issue of 1967

- The 3¢ issue of 1903 was engraved by A. Sealey who modeled his image after a portrait of Jackson by the American artist Thomas Sully. In 1824 Sully painted a study portrait from life of Andrew Jackson. By this time Jackson was a senator and a candidate for the upcoming presidential election of 1824. Two decades later, Jackson's ill health prompted Sully to repaint his 1824 study portrait from this image. The painting was completed shortly before Jackson's death in April 1845. The Sully portrait was the model for the engravings used on the postage issues of 1903 and 1967. The Sully painting is currently hanging in the National Gallery of Art in Washington DC.
- The 7-cent 1938 Presidential issue features Jackson's profile. The image of Jackson's was modeled after the Belle Kinney and Leopold F. Scholz bronze statue of Jackson which stands in the US Capitol's Rotunda.
- The 1¢ 1963 issue of Jackson was designed by William K. Schrange. Jackson's image was modeled after a medal created by Moritz Fuerst in 1829.
- The engraving of Jackson on the 10¢ issue of 1967 is taken from the same Thomas Sully painting that was used to model the engraving in the 1903 issue. Lester Beal designed the overall stamp image and design.

=== Andrew Jackson on commemorative issues ===
Andrew Jackson appears on the following commemorative issues:

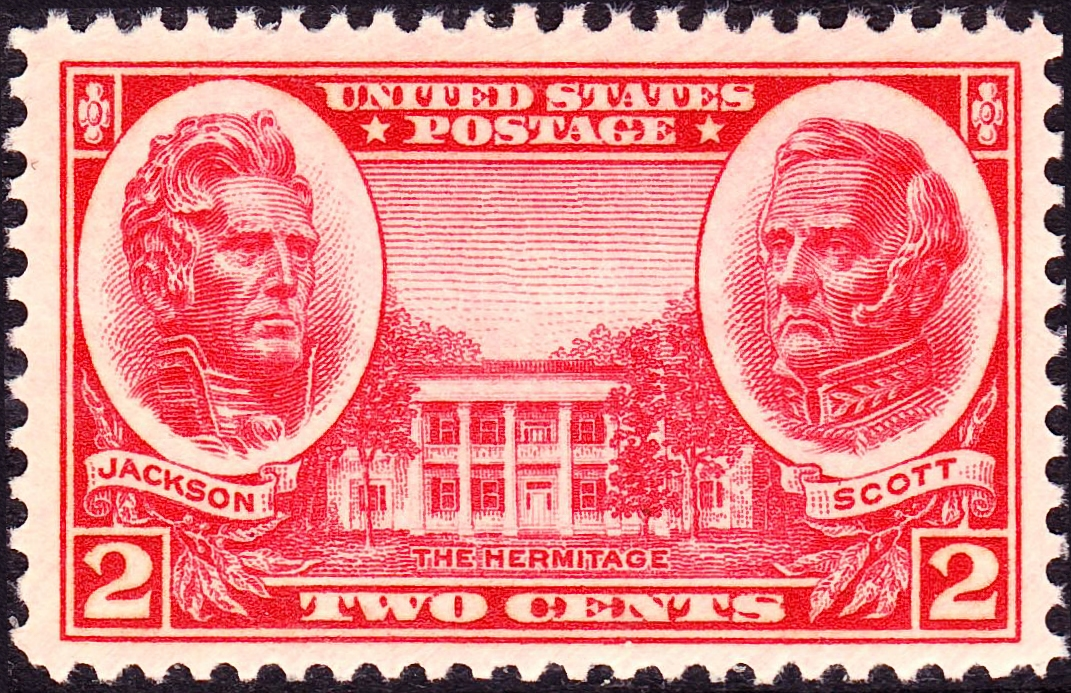
Jackson Scott Issue of 1937

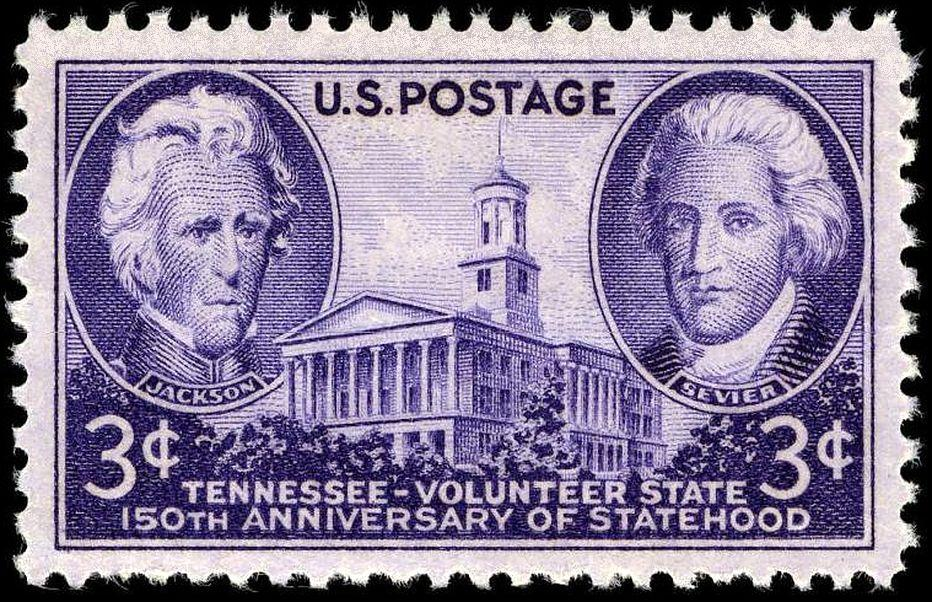
Tennessee Statehood Issue of 1946

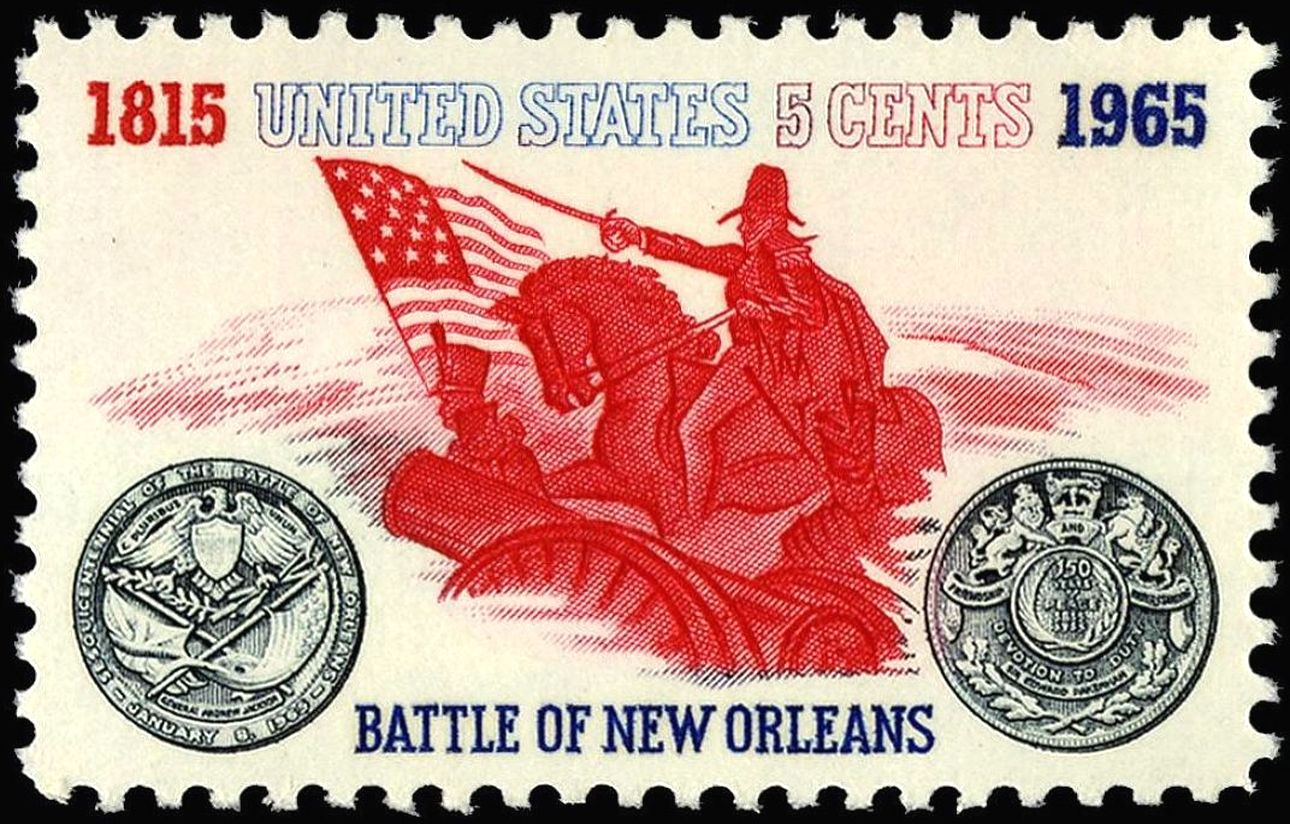
Battle of New Orleans Issue of 1961

- The 2-cent Army issue, released on January 15, 1937, features portraits of Andrew Jackson and Winfield Scott on either side with Jackson's home, the Hermitage, depicted in the background. Jackson was a hero of the War of 1812, his troops having defeated the British in the Battle of New Orleans. Scott served as a general in the U.S. Army longer than any other person.
- On June 1, 1946, the 150th anniversary of Tennessee statehood was commemorated by the issue of a 3-cent purple stamp depicting Andrew Jackson on the left and John Sevier on the right with the image of the Tennessee State Capitol in the center of the design. Jackson was the first U.S. president from Tennessee.
- The 5¢ "Battle of New Orleans" issue depicts then-General Jackson defeating an invading British army which was intent on seizing and taking control of New Orleans and the vast territory America had acquired with the Louisiana Purchase.
- Jackson appears on the AMERIPEX presidential issue of 1986.
- On August 19, 1994, the Postal Service issued a 5-dollar Washington-Jackson stamp in Pittsburgh, Pennsylvania, at the American Philatelic Society's annual stamp exposition. The stamp was modeled after a design created in 1869 by the National Bank Note Company It was originally prepared but never was used for the 1869 US postage series. The central image or vignette features a portrait of George Washington and Andrew Jackson. The portrayals of Washington and Jackson were engraved through the intaglio process by Stamp Venturers, Inc., and issued in small sheets of twenty stamps.

== Martin Van Buren ==
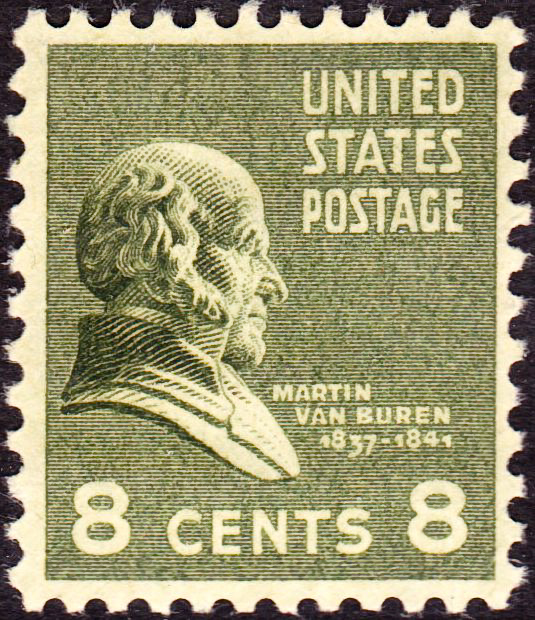
Issue of 1938

Martin Van Buren (December 5, 1782 – July 24, 1862) was the eighth president of the United States from 1837 to 1841. Before his presidency, he served as the eighth vice president (1833–1837) and the 10th secretary of state under Andrew Jackson. Van Buren was the first U.S. president to be born an American citizen.

- Van Buren appears on the 1938 issue, the 8-cent olive green denomination of the 1938 Presidential Series, a series of stamps whose denominations corresponded with the number of the given president's term. A sculpted bust of Van Buren on display in the U.S. Capitol's Senate Gallery was used as the model for the engraving of the president's image for this issue.
- Van Buren is honored on the AMERIPEX presidential issue of 1986.

== William Henry Harrison ==
William Henry Harrison (February 9, 1773 – April 4, 1841) was the ninth president of the United States from March to April 1841, and served in the U.S. Army, rising to the rank of major general during the War of 1812. The last U.S. president born a British royal subject before the start of the Revolutionary War, he was also the first to first to die in office, dying one month to the day after taking the oath of office. Harrison's grandson, Benjamin Harrison of Indiana, was the 23rd president, from 1889 to 1893, making them the only grandparent–grandchild pair of presidents.

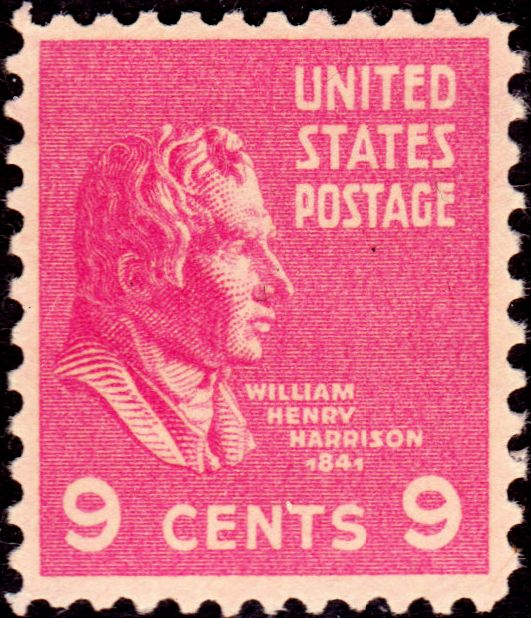
Issue of 1938

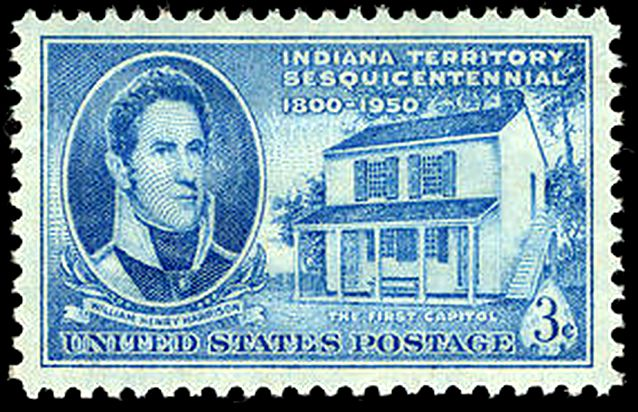
Issue of 1950

- Harrison appears on the 9-cent pink 1938 Presidential Series issue. The image of Harrison is taken from a bust displayed in the Rotunda of the Virginia State Capitol building. The issue was designed by William Schrage and the master engraver was C. A. Brooks.
- On July 4, 1950, the US Post Office issued a 3-cent Indiana territory commemorative celebrating the 150th anniversary of Indiana statehood, releasing the stamp at the Vincennes, Indiana Post office. The central design of the stamp is a portrait of William Henry Harrison who was the first governor of Indiana Territory. Behind him is an image of the First State Capitol building.
- Harrison appears on the AMERIPEX presidential commemorative issues of 1986.

== John Tyler ==
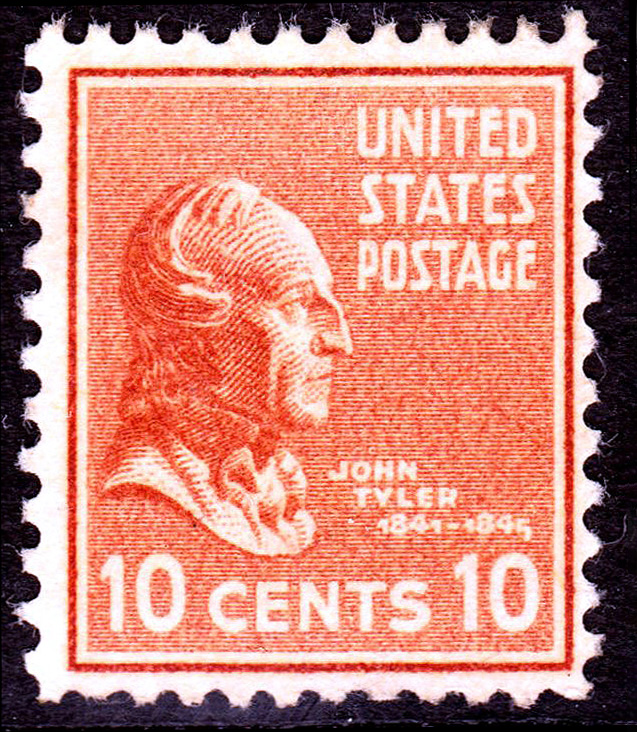
Issue of 1938

John Tyler (March 29, 1790 – January 18, 1862) was the tenth president of the United States (1841–1845). He became president upon the death of William Henry Harrison, first vice president to succeed to the presidency intra-term.

- Tyler's image appears on the orange-brown 10-cent denomination of the 1938 Presidential Issue, modeled after a bust by John Keck on display in the Rotunda of the Virginia State Capitol. The Tyler postage issue of 1938 was used primarily in combination with other denominations. Examples of solo usage are most often found on outgoing international mail.
- The only other postage stamp honoring Tyler (to date) was issued in 1986, a 22-cent stamp in the AMERIPEX presidential issue, where each president up to and including Lyndon Johnson appears on his own stamp.

== James K. Polk ==
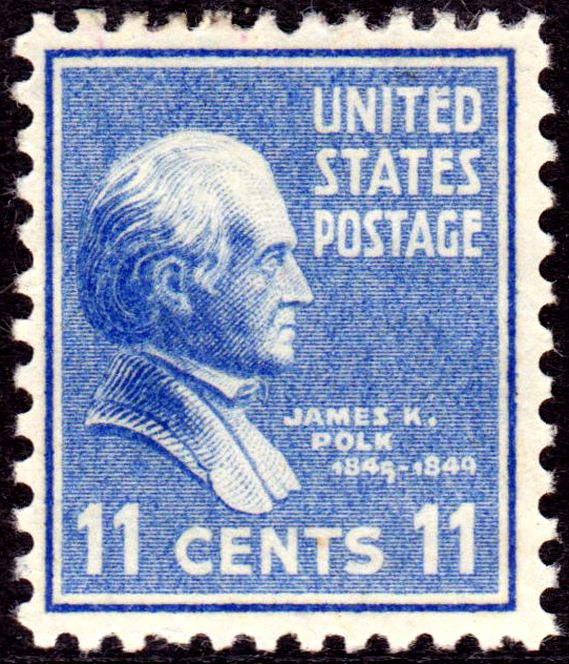
Issue of 1938

Issue of 1995

James Knox Polk (November 2, 1795 – June 15, 1849) was the 11th president of the United States (1845–1849). Polk was born in North Carolina. He later lived in and became Governor of the state of Tennessee. A Democrat, and an ardent supporter of Andrew Jackson, Polk served as Speaker of the House (1835–1839) and Governor of Tennessee (1839–1841) before becoming president. During his single four-year term, Polk accomplished every major goal that he set for his administration and successfully managed the Mexican–American War, obtaining for the United States most of its present contiguous land area.

- The image of Polk appears on the 11-cent denomination of the 1938 Presidential Issue. Polk's profile on the stamp was modeled after a medal struck by the US Mint. This issue was printed in ultramarine and was printed only as a sheet stamp, first issued in Washington, D.C., on September 8, 1938.
- Polk is honored on the AMERIPEX presidential issue of 1986.
- The Postal Service honored Polk on the 200th anniversary of his birth with the issue of a 32-cent commemorative stamp, first issued on November 2, 1995, in Columbia, Tennessee, where Polk spent his adult life. The issue was engraved by the intaglio process, printed in red-brown by the Banknote Corporation of America. This stamp is one of the few issues after the 1950s that spells out the full phrase "UNITED STATES POSTAGE". It is also one of the very few modern-day regular issues with the years of birth and death of the subject inscribed on the face.

== Zachary Taylor ==
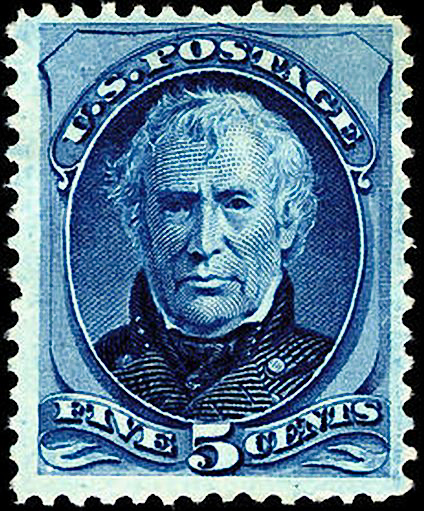
Issue of 1875

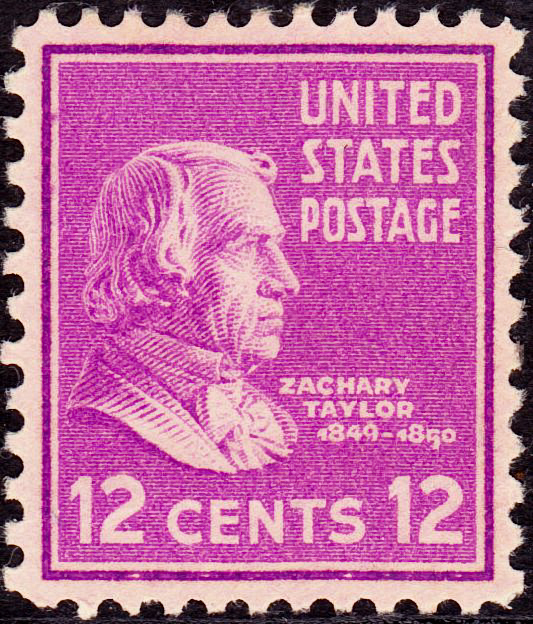
Issue of 1938

Zachary Taylor (November 24, 1784 – July 9, 1850) was the 12th president of the United States (1849–1850) and an American military leader. Taylor ran as a Whig in the 1848 presidential election, defeating Lewis Cass and becoming the first man elected to the presidency without having held any previous elected office. He served in the Army for over forty years, had a reputation for never losing a battle, and was nicknamed "Old Rough and Ready". During the Mexican–American War (1846–1848) Taylor became a national hero, and with this fame he was elected to the presidency.

- Zachary Taylor is honored on three U.S. postage stamps, regular issues. The first Taylor stamp was issued in 1875. This first issue was printed by the Continental Bank Note Company on yellowish wove paper. When the American Bank Note Company received the federal contract to print postage stamps in 1879 it printed the second Taylor issue (identical in appearance to the 1875 issue) on soft porous paper, using the original dies of Continental Bank Note Company. The engraving of Taylor was modeled after a daguerreotype of Taylor by Civil War photographer Mathew Brady.
- Taylor also appears on the 12-cent denomination of the 1938 Presidential Series. A bust displayed in the Rotunda of the Virginia State Capitol inspired the image depicted on this issue.
- The only commemorative issue dedicated to Taylor was issued in the 1986 AMERIPEX Presidential issue.

== Millard Fillmore ==
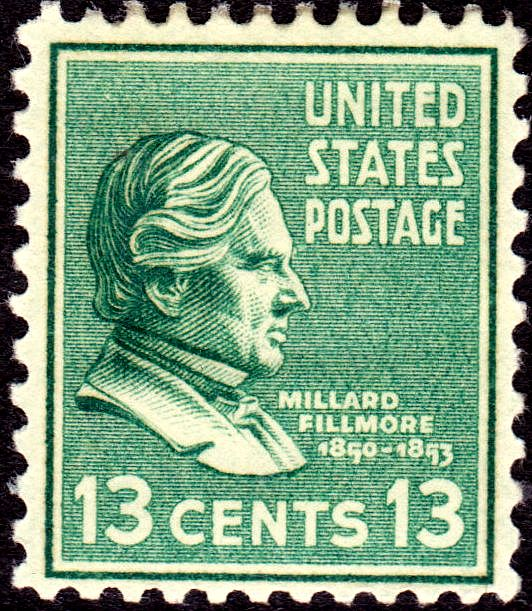
Issue of 1938

Millard Fillmore (January 7, 1800 – March 8, 1874) was the 13th president of the United States, serving from 1850 until 1853. He became president upon the death of Zachary Taylor, under whom he had been the nation's 12th vice president, and was the last member of the Whig Party to serve as president.

- Fillmore appears in the 1938 Presidential Issue on the 13¢ denomination in that series. The engraved image of Fillmore was modeled after a bust by Robert Cushing displayed in the Senate Gallery of the US Capitol. This was Fillmore's first appearance on a U.S. postage stamp.
- Fillmore also appears in the AMERIPEX presidential series, issued by the Postal Service on May 22, 1986.

== Franklin Pierce ==
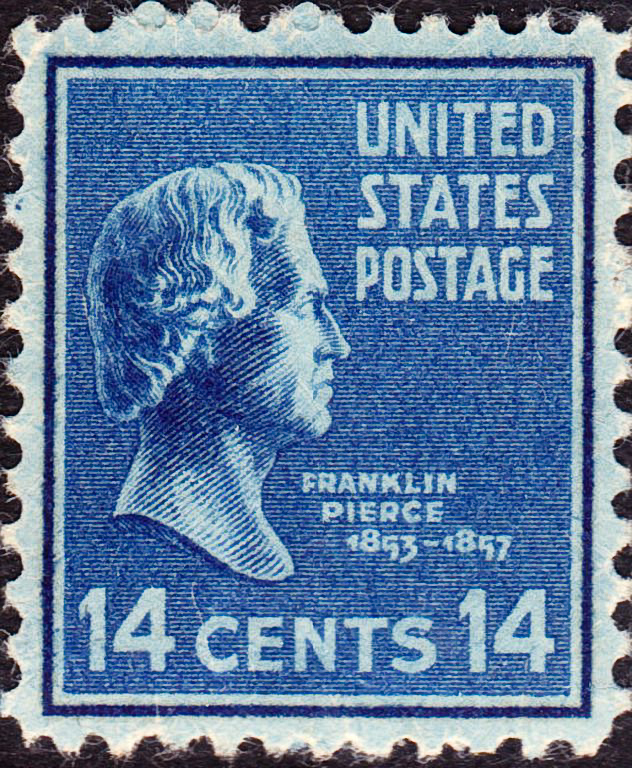
Issue of 1938

Franklin Pierce (November 23, 1804 – October 8, 1869), a politician and lawyer, was the 14th president of the United States, serving from 1853 to 1857, and is the only president from New Hampshire. Pierce enlisted in the volunteer U.S. Army during the Mexican–American War and rose to the rank of colonel. In March 1847, he was appointed brigadier general of volunteers and took command of a brigade of reinforcements for Winfield Scott's army marching on Mexico City.

- Pierce appears on the 14¢ issue of the 1938 Presidential Series. A medal struck by the U.S. Mint served as the model for the engraved image of Pierce. The stamp was issued on October 6, 1938.
- Pierce did not appear on a commemorative stamp until the AMERIPEX presidential issue on May 22, 1986.

== James Buchanan ==
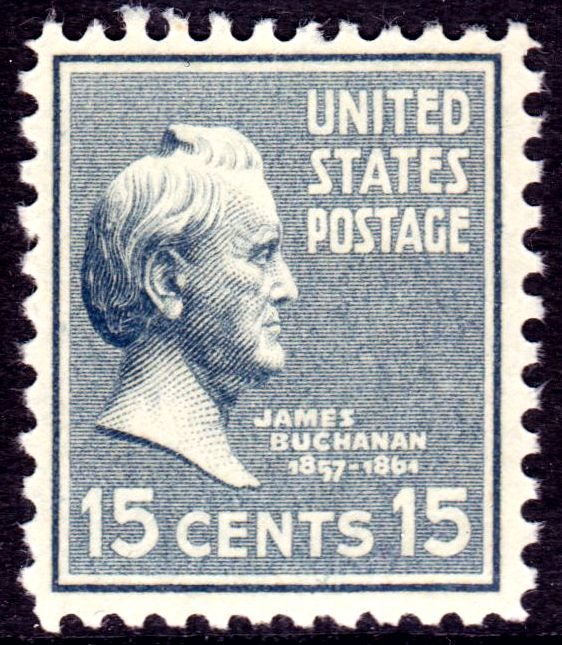
Issue of 1938

James Buchanan, Jr. (April 23, 1791 – June 1, 1868) was the 15th president of the United States, serving from 1857 until 1861. The last president to be born in the 18th century, Buchanan served as a congressman (1821–1831), Senator (1834–1845), Minister to Russia (1832–1834) and Secretary of State (1845–1849) before ascending to the presidency in 1857. Opinions by historians of Buchanan's presidency vary, as some credit him for keeping a divided nation together for so long while others fault him for failing to avert a civil war. To date he is the only president from the state of Pennsylvania and the only one never to have married.

- The engraved portrayal of James Buchanan appears on the 15-cent issue of the 1938 Presidential Series. The image was modeled after a sculpted bust by Henry Dexter which is now on display in the National Gallery of Art in Washington, DC. This was Buchanan's first appearance on a U.S. postage stamp.
- Buchanan also appears on the AMERIPEX presidential issue of 1986.

== Abraham Lincoln ==
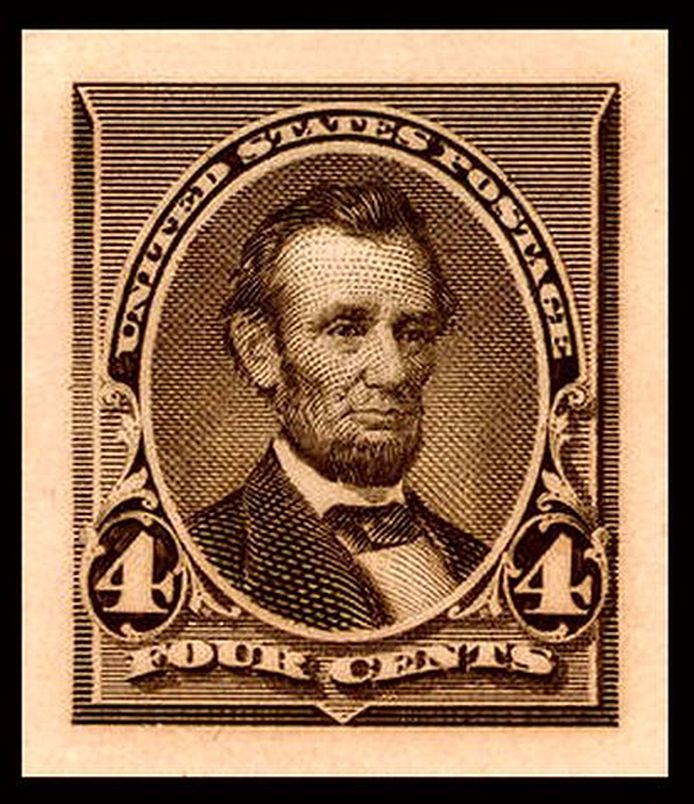
Abraham Lincoln Die proof of 1890 issue

Abraham Lincoln (February 12, 1809 – April 15, 1865) was the 16th president of the United States, serving from 1861 to 1865. The first Republican to be elected president, he successfully led the United States through its Civil War, thus preserving the Union and bringing an end to slavery, first issuing the Emancipation Proclamation in 1863, and then promoting ratification of the Thirteenth Amendment to the Constitution. His presidency was cut short when he was assassinated in April 1865, only six weeks into his second term.

Second only to the number of times George Washington has been featured on the face of U.S. postage, Lincoln's appearances on U.S. postage are more numerous than those of all the remaining presidents. His first appearance on U.S. postage came on or near the one-year anniversary of his death.

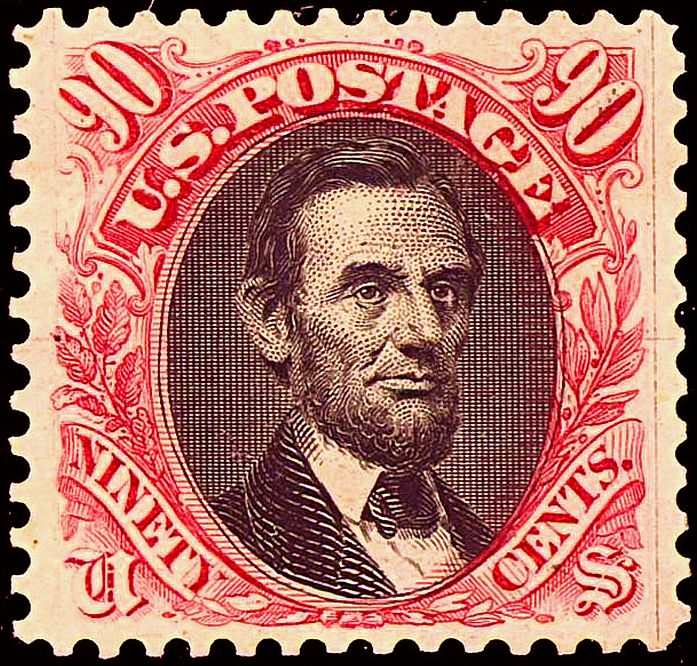
Issue of 1869

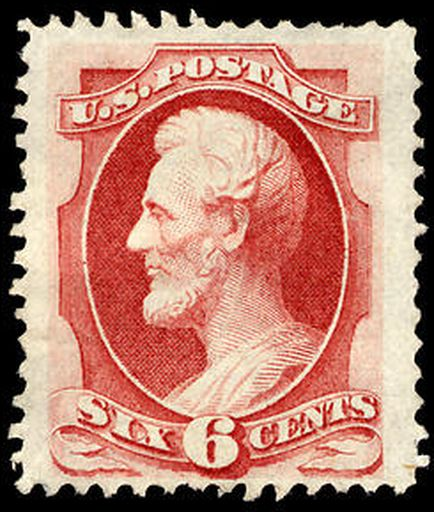
Issue of 1870

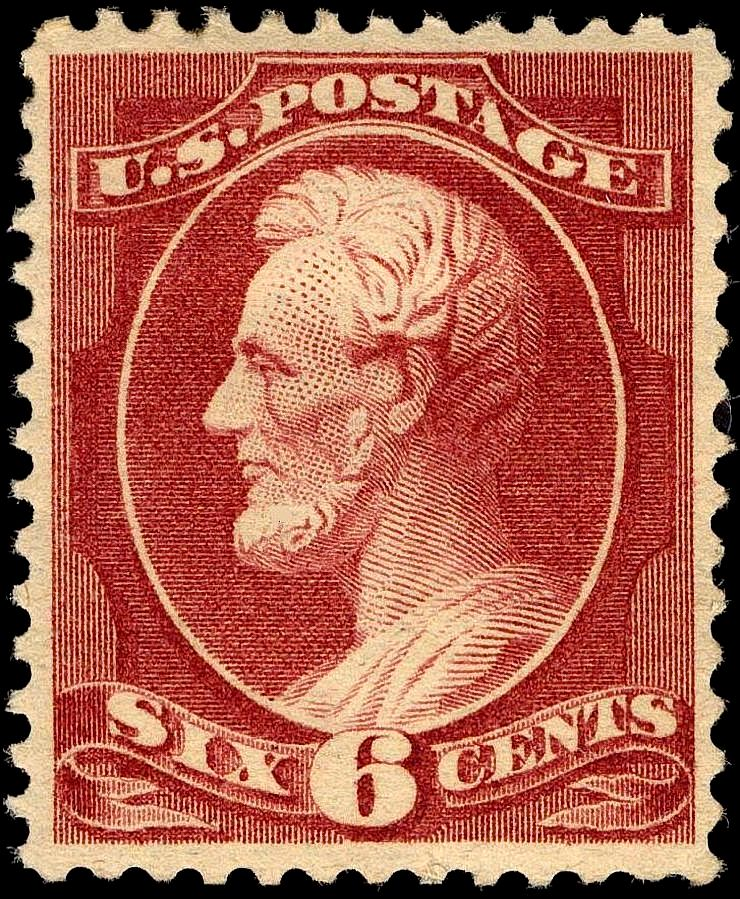
Issue of 1882

- The first postage stamp to honor Abraham Lincoln displayed above was issued either on April 14, 1866, one year to the day after his death in 1865, or about a week thereafter (experts and U.S. Postal records disagree). The engraving of Lincoln was modeled after a photograph taken by Mathew Brady.
- The 90¢ issue of 1869 displays an engraving of Lincoln that was fashioned after the same photograph taken by Mathew Brady used as a model for the 1866 issue. A total of only 47,460 stamps were printed by the National Bank Note Company.
- The 6¢ 1870 issue depicts an engraving of Lincoln, modeled after a sculpture by Thomas Dow Jones.

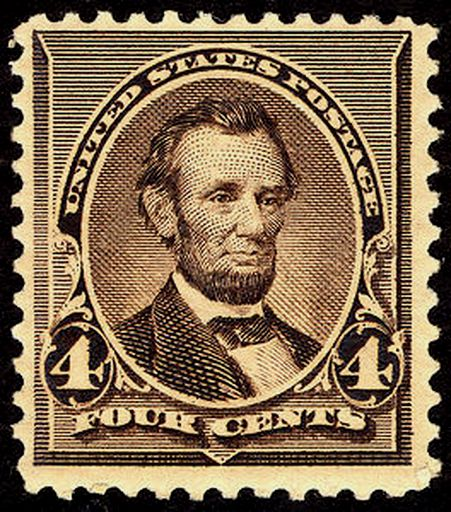
Issue of 1890

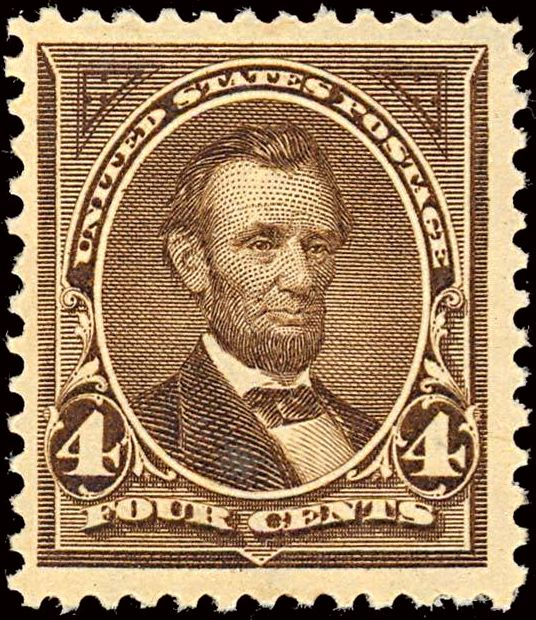
Issue of 1894

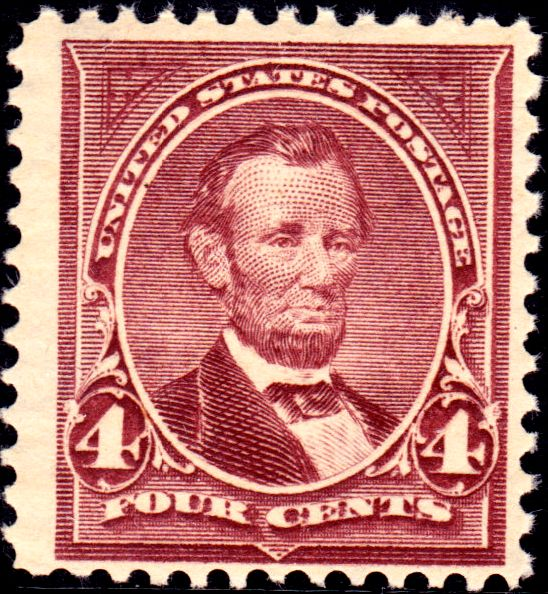
Issue of 1898

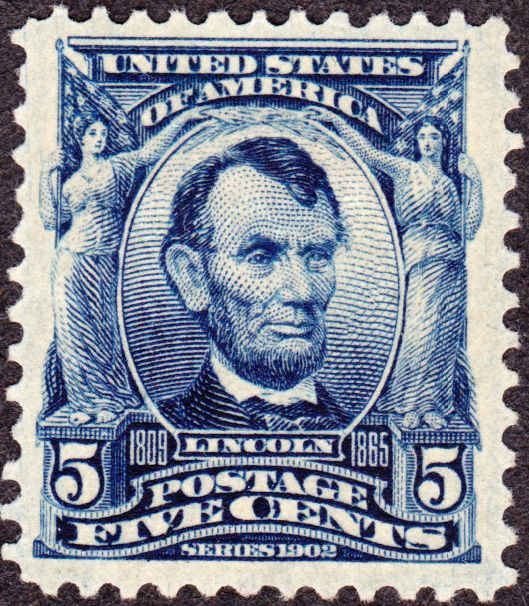
Issue of 1903

- There are several other prominent artists behind the designs of Lincoln stamps. The 1890 issue was printed by the American Bank Note Company. Alfred Jones engraved the portrait, modeling it after a photo of Lincoln taken by Mathew Brady, arguably the most important photographer of the Civil War era. Among the most notable postage stamp designer-artists is Clair Aubrey Huston who designed the Bureau stamps using an existing engraving for the vignette.
- The 4¢ issue of 1898 was engraved by George F.C. Smillie, an engraver at the Bureau of Engraving and Printing, who had made the earlier engraving in 1898. Smillie also based his work on a photograph of Lincoln taken in 1864 by Mathew Brady.
- The 5-cent blue stamp was designed by R. Ostrander Smith. The engraving was done by Marcus W. Baldwin, also taken from the photograph by Mathew Brady.

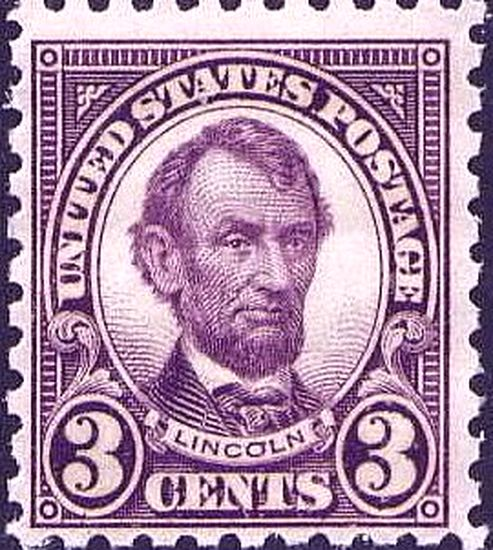
Issue of 1926

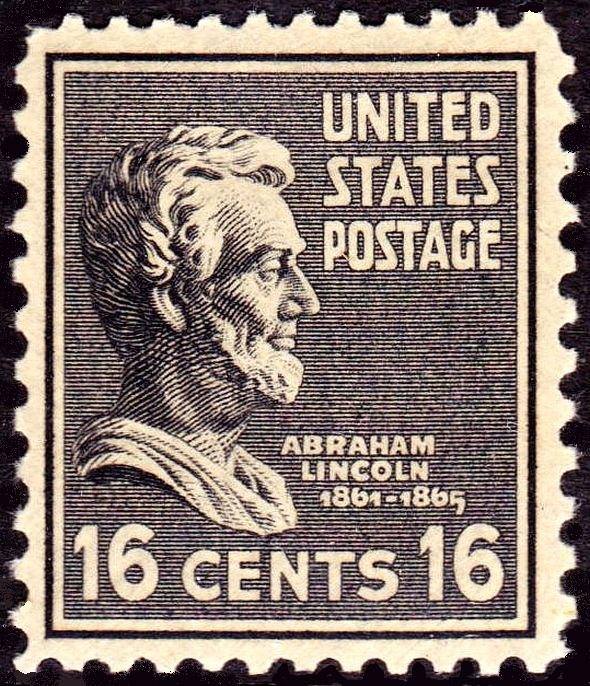
Issue of 1938

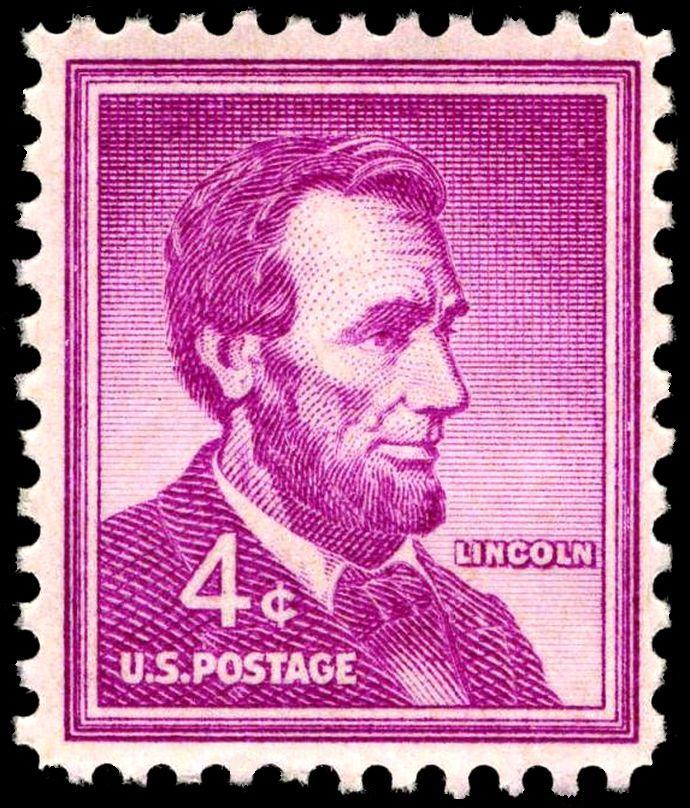
Issue of 1954

- The 3¢ issues of 1923, 1925 and 1927 depict Abraham Lincoln. Clair Aubrey Huston designed the stamp using an existing engraving of Lincoln used by the Bureau in 1894 for the vignette. George Smillie, an engraver at the Bureau of Engraving and Printing, had made the earlier engraving in 1898. Smillie based his work on a photograph of Lincoln taken in 1864 by Mathew Brady. The issued was first released on Lincoln's birthday, February 12, 1923, in Washington, D.C., and in Hodgenville, Kentucky, near Lincoln's birthplace. With the postal rate increase from 2 cents to 3 cents in 1932, Lincoln became the first president other than Washington to be featured on a definitive stamp for the normal letter rate. Since two Washington 3-cent stamps were also available by then, the Post Office discontinued the production of the 3-cent Lincoln, ceasing deliveries of it in July 1933 and canceling all printing plates for it. Owing to popular demand, however – particularly from collectors who wished to have examples of the stamp postmarked February 12, 1934 (the 125th anniversary of Lincoln's birth) – the 3-cent Lincoln was reissued from new plates on February 7 of that year.
- Lincoln appears on the 16¢ issue of the 1938 Presidential Series. A bust displayed in the Senate Gallery, sculpted by Sarah Fisher Ames, was the model that inspired Lincoln's likeness on the engraving for this issue. First issued in Washington, D.C., on October 20, 1938.
- The next definitive series, the Liberty Issue, featured Lincoln on its 4¢ stamp, released on November 16, 1954. This issue paid the 1st class mail rate until 1963. Designed by Charles R. Chickering, the design was modeled after by an original drawing from a photograph of a Douglas Volk portrait. During its use it was considered the most popular postage stamp in the United States.

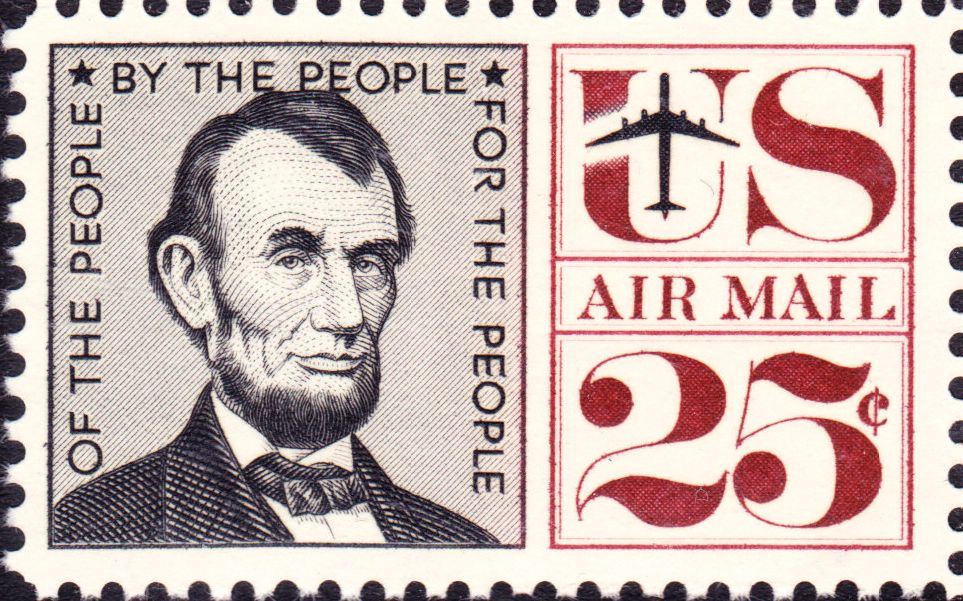
Airmail Issue of 1960

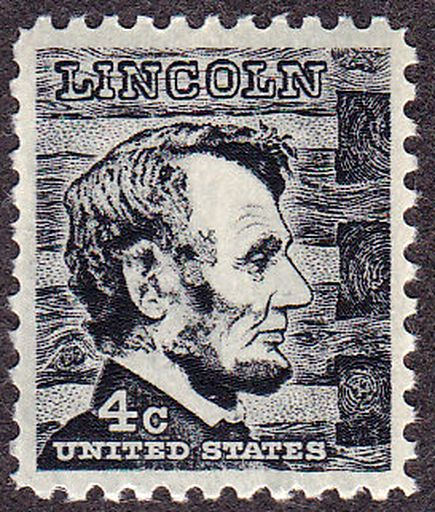
Issue of 1965

- Lincoln is the only president to ever appear on the face of a U.S. Airmail postage stamp, first issued on April 22, 1960, in San Francisco, California.
- On November 17, 1965, the U.S. Post Office issued the 4-cent black stamp featuring Lincoln's profile with the "log cabin" background, first issued in New York City. It is the first issue among the Prominent Americans series. Though Lincoln had very little formal education, his speeches and writings are today considered masterpieces. This is the theme of the design with the log cabin which has become synonymous with Lincoln's humble beginnings. The engraving for this issue was modeled after a photo taken by Mathew Brady.

=== Lincoln on commemorative issues ===
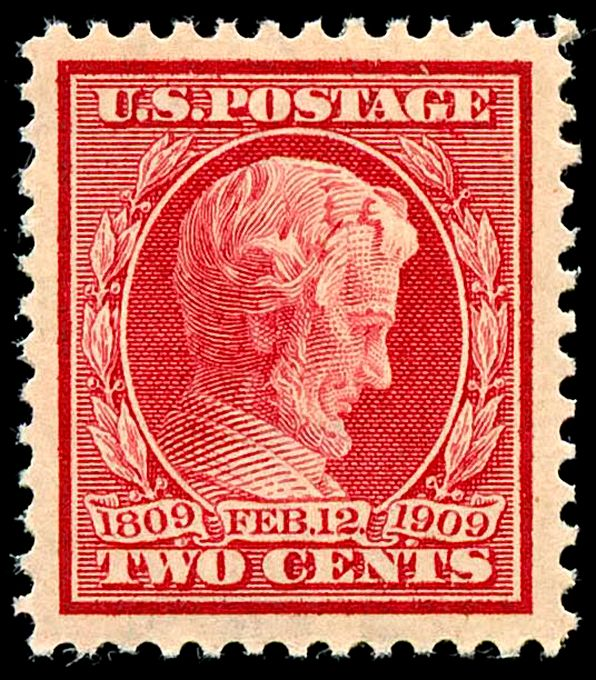
Issue of 1909

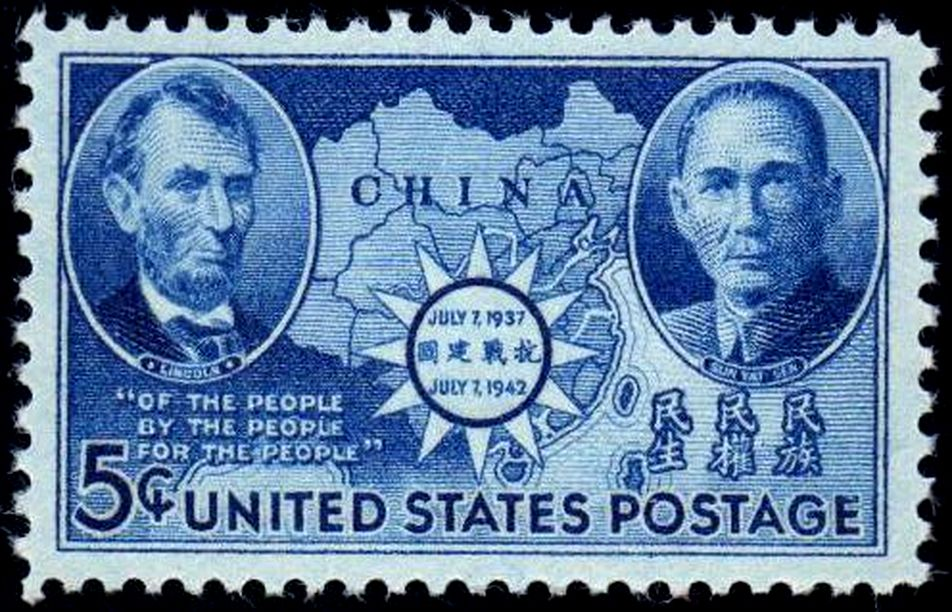
Chinese Resistance Issue of 1942

- The 2-cent Lincoln stamp of 1909 – the first U.S. single stamp commemorative issue – had the same dimensions as a definitive stamp. This is not surprising, for it was, in effect, cloned from the 2-cent Washington definitive issue of the previous year. Using a photostat of that stamp as a template, the designer Claire Aubrey Huston inserted an image of Lincoln into the wreath-surrounded oval occupied by Washington, and then superimposed the date ribbons in wash, turning the composite over to the engravers. Lincoln had appeared on at least one denomination of every regular issue since 1866. When the definitive issues of 1908 featured only the portraits of Washington and Franklin, there was considerable public disappointment at Lincoln's exclusion. The 100th anniversary issue of his birth created an opportunity to mollify the situation. The engraving of Lincoln on this issue by Marcus Baldwin is modeled after a statue by sculptor Augustus Saint-Gaudens.
- On July 7, 1942, the U.S. Post Office issued a 5¢ postage stamp commemorating the fifth anniversary of Chinese resistance to Japanese oppression as a tribute to China and its struggle to preserve a free government. The design of this issue depicts a map of China with an image of the sun, national symbol of China, superimposed on the map. Portraits of Abraham Lincoln and Sun Yat-sen, first president of the Republic of China, are on either side of the stamp.

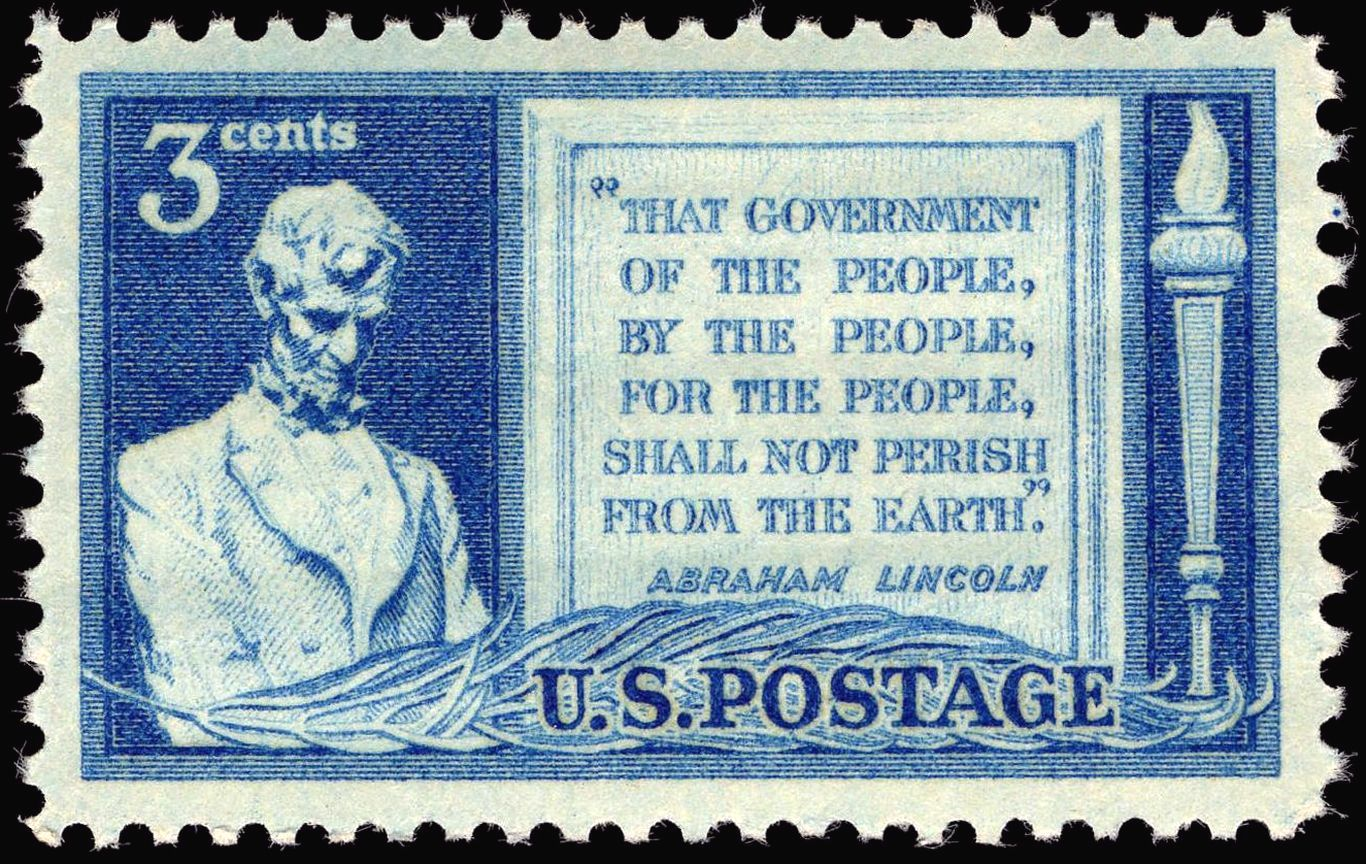
Gettysburg Address Issue of 1948

- On November 19, 1948, eighty-five years to the day after President Abraham Lincoln delivered his most famous speech, the U.S. Post Office released the commemorative Gettysburg Address issue. Lincoln delivered the Gettysburg Address at the dedication of the Soldiers' National Cemetery in Gettysburg, Pennsylvania, on November 19, 1863, four and a half months after Union armies defeated those of the Confederacy at the Battle of Gettysburg, the turn of the American Civil War.
Lincoln Sesquicentennial Issue

The U.S. Post Office issued a series of four commemorative stamps during 1958 and 1959 in honor of the 150th anniversary of Abraham Lincoln's birth in 1809. The four stamps were modeled after various famous works of art.

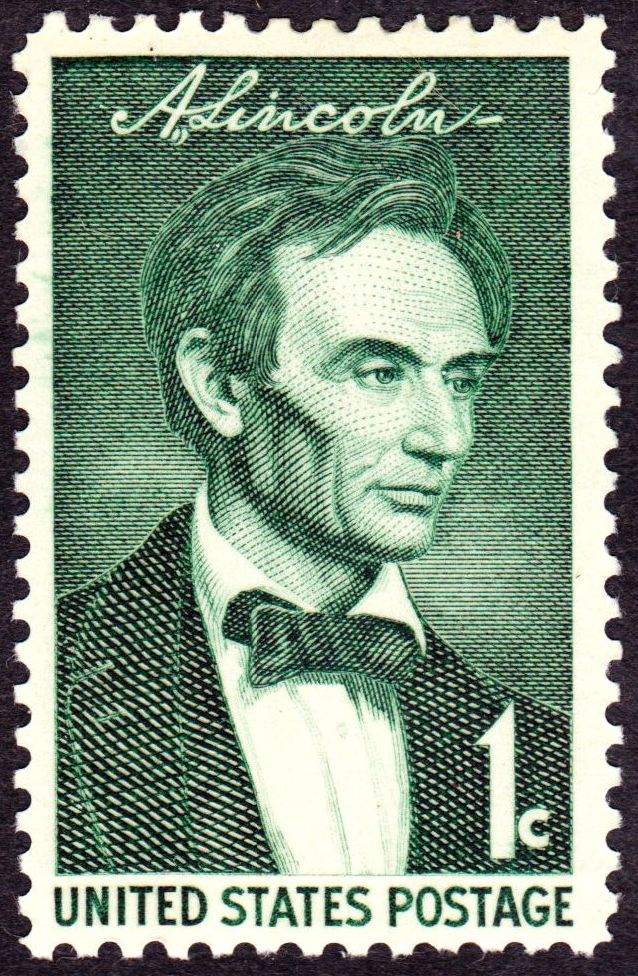
The Young Abe Lincoln, Issue of 1959

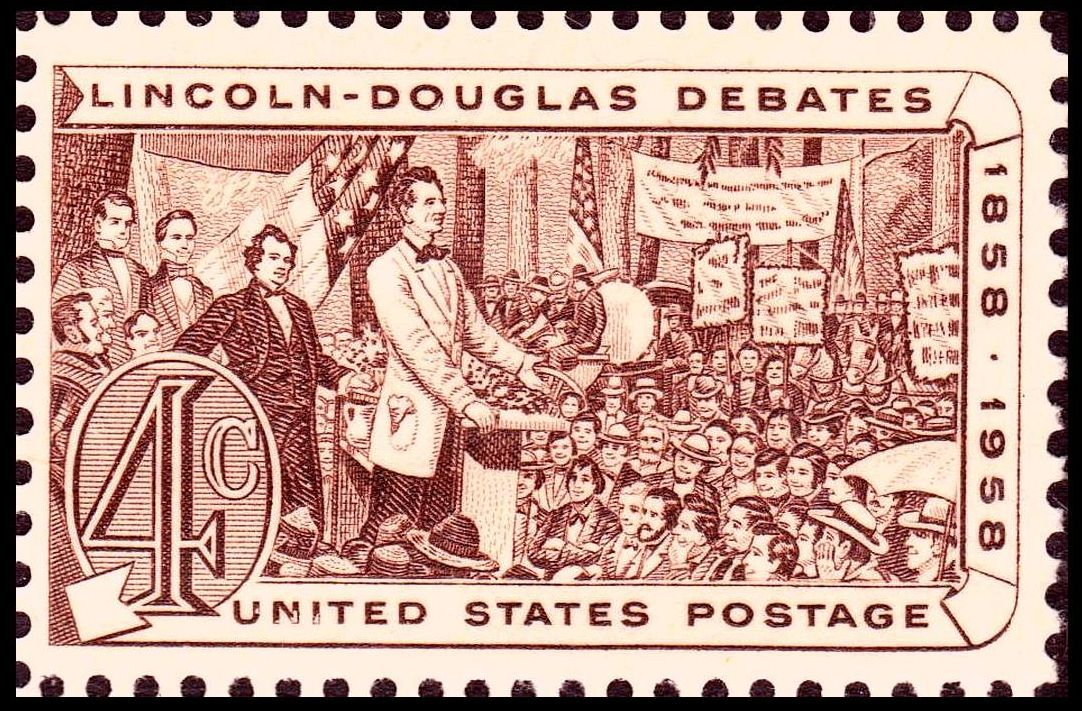
Lincoln Douglas debates of 1858, Issue of 1958

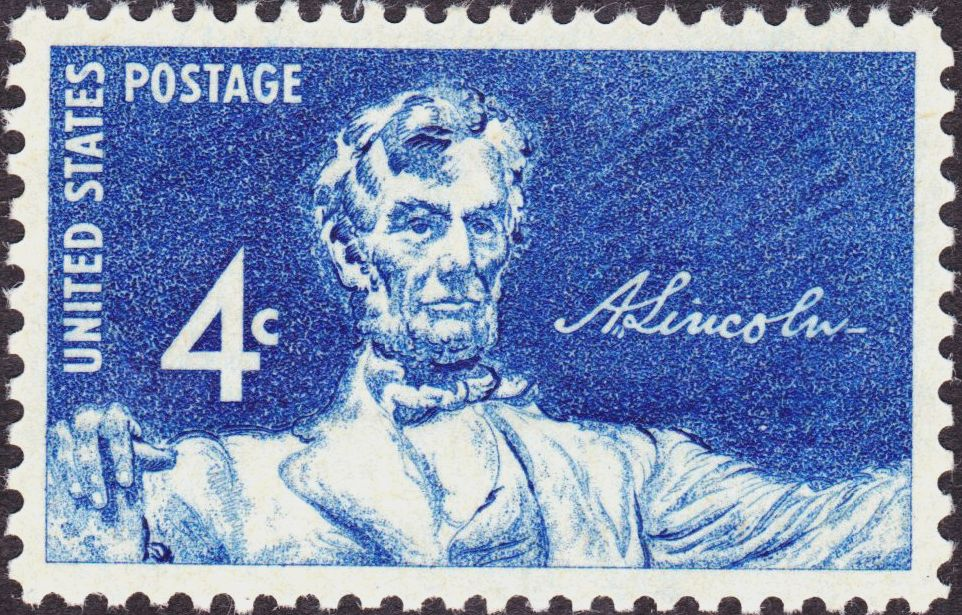
Lincoln Memorial Issue of 1959

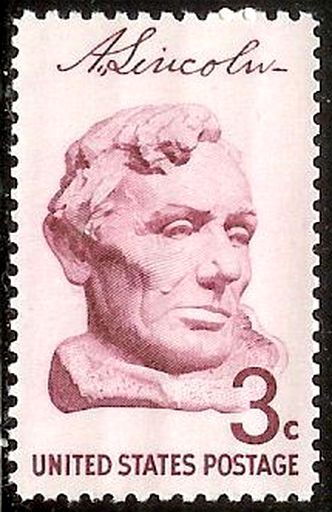
Issue of 1959

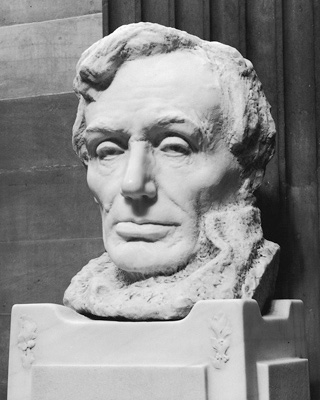
Bust of Lincoln, 1909 by Gutzon Borglum Used as model for engraving of 1959 issue.

- The 1¢ green Lincoln issue was first released to the public on February 12, 1959, the 150th anniversary of Lincoln's birth in 1809, in Hodgenville, Kentucky, near the place of Lincoln's birth. The engraving is modeled after a painting by George Healy, which was rediscovered and recommended for the stamp by Katherine McCook Knox. Robert L. Miller of the Bureau of Engraving and Printing modeled the overall stamp design. The 1-cent Lincoln stamp features the famous "Beardless Lincoln" portrait painted by Healy from life in 1860 in Springfield, Illinois, shortly after Lincoln was elected president.
- The 4¢ Lincoln-Douglas debate postage stamp was first issued on August 27, 1958, at Freeport, Illinois. This issue was the first in the series and was first released on the 100th anniversary of the Lincoln-Douglas debates. The engraved image is modeled after a painting by Joseph Boggs Beale that portrays Lincoln addressing an outdoor crowd with Douglas standing behind him. Artist William K. Schrage of the Bureau of Engraving and Printing based the stamp design on work done by Ervine Metzl of New York City.
- The U.S. Post Office issued the blue 4-cent Lincoln stamp on May 30, 1959, at Washington, D.C. The issue features a portion of a famous statue sculpted by Daniel Chester French, which sits in the Lincoln Memorial in Washington, D.C.
- On February 27, 1959, at New York, New York, the Post Office issued the 3¢ Lincoln Birth Sesquicentennial commemorative stamp, the third in the series of four. The stamp features a sculptured bust of Lincoln by Gutzon Borglum. Done in marble in 1906, it now stands in the rotunda of the Capitol in Washington, D.C.

Issue of 1984

Issue of 1995

- The Postal Service issued a stamp on April 16, 1984, commemorating the 50th anniversary of the National Archives, and including silhouettes of Lincoln and George Washington in the design.
- On October 16, 1984, the Postal Service issued its 20¢ commemorative postage stamp commemorating the theme "A Nation of Readers". The First Day Ceremony took place in Washington, D.C., in the Coolidge Auditorium of the Library of Congress. The issue was designed by Bradbury Thompson of Riverside, Connecticut, who based the design on a photograph by Mathew Brady which shows Abraham Lincoln reading from a book to his son Thomas Lincoln.
- The Postal Service issued a 20-stamp sheet of 32-cent Civil War stamps on June 29, 1995, in Gettysburg, Pennsylvania. Designed by Mark Hess of Katonah, New York, the stamps are the second installment of the Classic Collection. This issue depicts Lincoln with the Capitol under reconstruction in the background. Text about Lincoln is on the back of this issue. Issued as part of this collection was a 20 stamp sheet of 32-cent stamps, also designed by Mark Hess, depicting Confederate president Jefferson Davis. Text about Davis is on the back this issue. This is the only U.S. stamp depicting Davis. (Davis did appear on Confederate postage stamps.)
- Lincoln also appears in the AMERIPEX presidential series, 36 commemorative stamps, issued by the Post Office on May 22, 1986.
Lincoln 200th Anniversary of birth commemorative issues

Issue of 2009

- On February 9, 2009, in Springfield, Illinois, the 200th anniversary of Abraham Lincoln's birth, the Postal Service first issued a set of four commemorative issues portraying Lincoln at different periods in his life. Lincoln's portrayal and stamp artwork was created by artist Mark Summers of Waterdown, Ontario, Canada. The background depicted in the stamps are taken from famous themes, e.g. the Lincoln-Douglas debates.

== Andrew Johnson ==
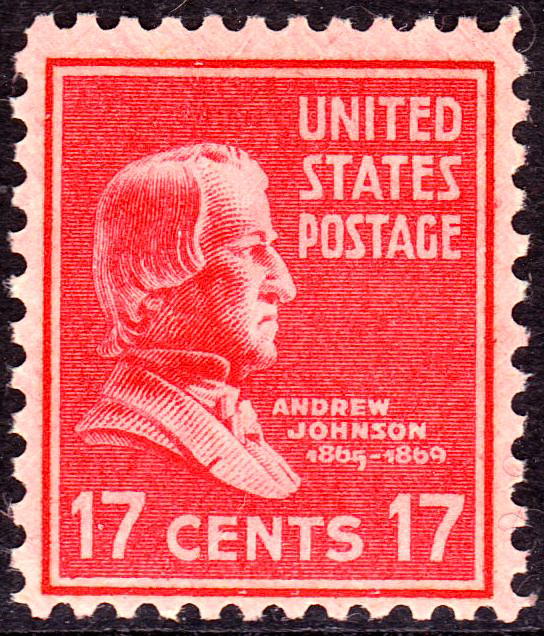
Issue of 1938

Andrew Johnson (December 29, 1808 – July 31, 1875) was the 17th president of the United States serving from 1865 to 1869. As a Unionist, he was the only Southern senator who didn't give up his post upon secession. Johnson was the most prominent War Democrat and Southern Unionist during the Civil War prior to becoming the 16th vice president under President Abraham Lincoln in March 1865. After assuming the presidency following Lincoln's assassination on April 15, 1865, Johnson presided over the first 4 years of the post–Civil War Reconstruction era.

- The 17¢ rose-red stamp from the Presidential Issue was issued on October 27, 1938, and marked the first appearance of Andrew Johnson on a postage stamp. The engraving of Johnson's profile was modeled after by a bust displayed in the Senate Gallery in Washington, D.C.
- Johnson also appears once in the AMERIPEX presidential series, issued on May 22, 1986. It is the only commemorative stamp issued in his honor to date.

== Ulysses S. Grant ==
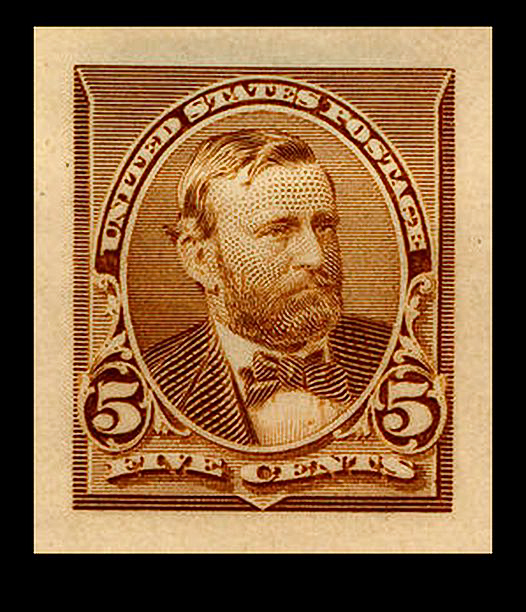
Ulysses S. Grant Die proof of 1st Grant stamp

Ulysses S. Grant (April 27, 1822 – July 23, 1885) was the 18th president of the United States from 1869 to 1877. A national hero of the American Civil War, Grant was elected president in 1868, the youngest man theretofore elected president. He was re-elected in 1872. Grant began his lifelong career as a soldier after graduating from the United States Military Academy in 1843. Fighting in the Mexican–American War, he was a close observer of the techniques of generals Zachary Taylor and Winfield Scott. During President Johnson's term, Grant was appointed to be the secretary of war.

Ulysses S. Grant died in 1885 and first appeared on U.S. postage some five years later in 1890 when the American Bank Note Company first printed the postage stamps that depicted his portrait.

The first Grant postage stamps
Engravings were modeled after a photograph by William Kurtz

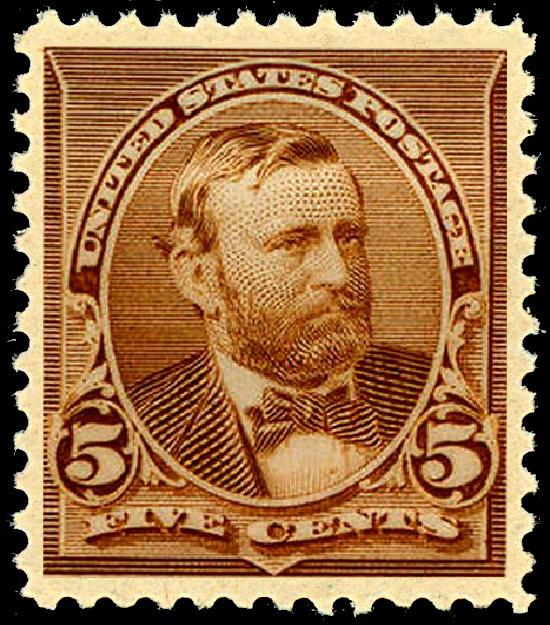
Issue of 1890

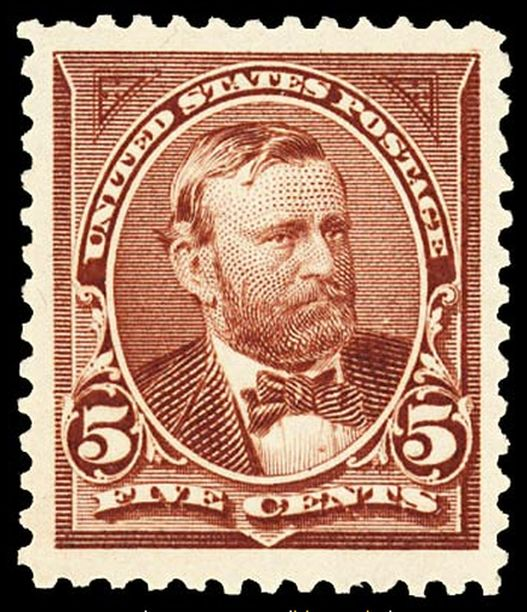
Issue of 1894

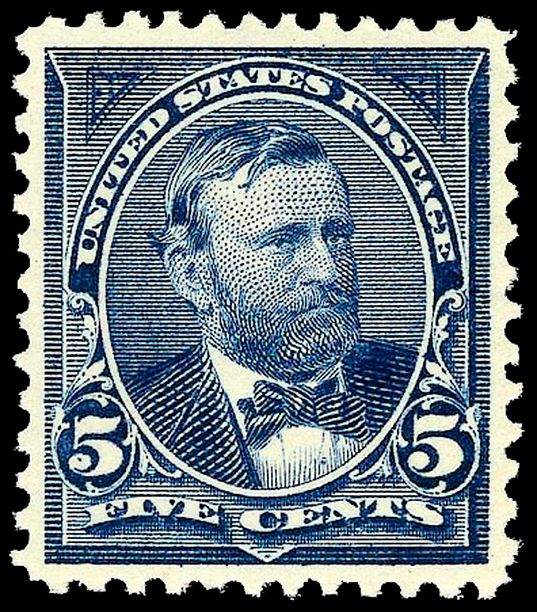
Issue of 1898

- On June 2, 1890, the Post Office issued a brown 5-cent stamp honoring Grant. It was the first U.S. postage stamp to depict the former president and Civil War general. This issue was released exactly twenty-five years after Gen. Edmond Kirby Smith's surrender of the last major Confederate army at Galveston, Texas, on June 2, 1865. The issue was printed by the American Bank Note Company.

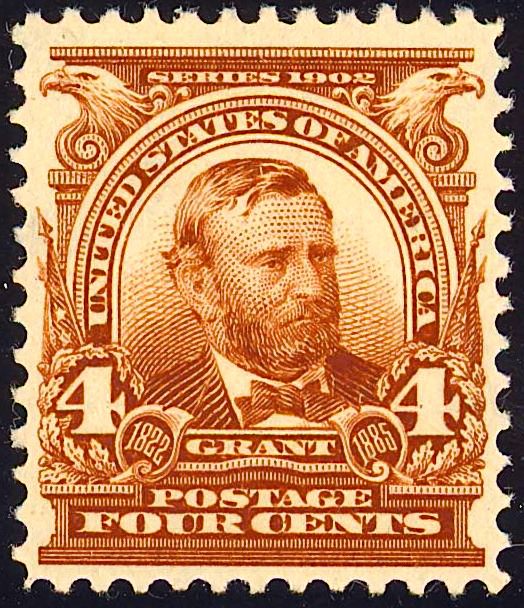
Issue of 1903

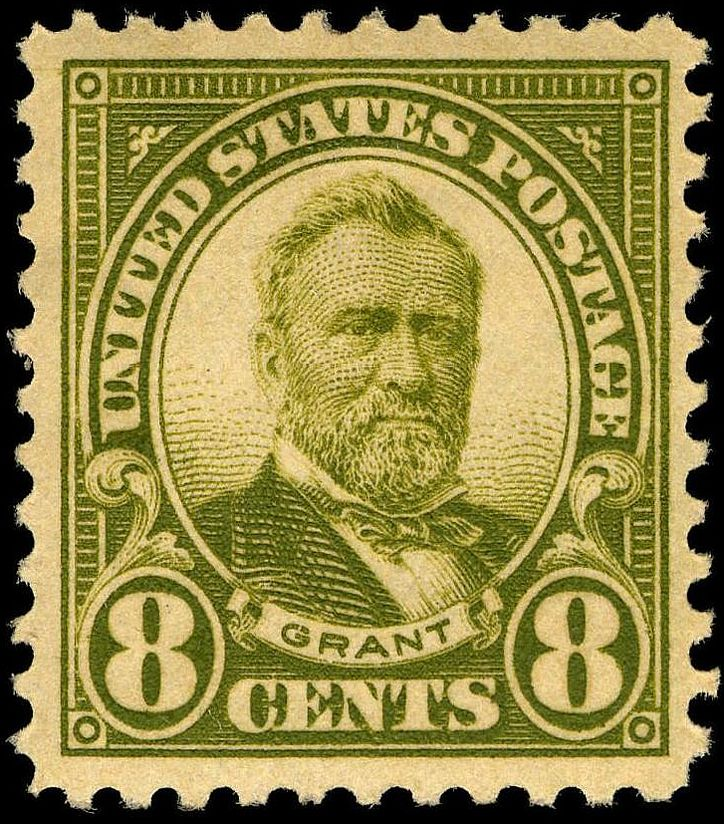
Issue of 1923

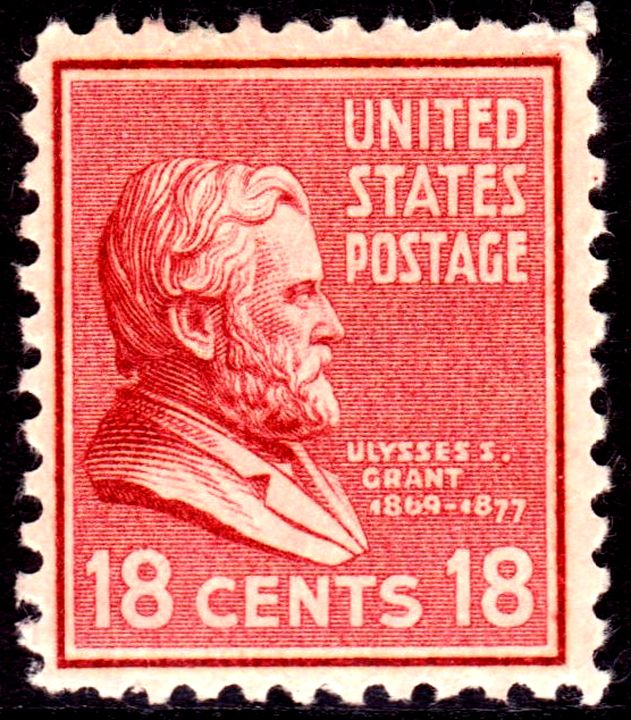
Issue of 1938

- On February 10, 1903, the Grant 4-cent brown stamp was issued. The design is by R. Ostrander Smith and was based on a tintype by Kurtz. The stamp was engraved by George F.C. Smillie.
- On May 1, 1923, the Post Office issued an 8¢ definitive issue honoring Ulysses S. Grant. Clair Aubrey Huston designed the stamp image. A photograph of Grant taken by Civil War photographer Mathew Brady served as the model for Huston's vignette. The die for the vignette was engraved by Louis Schofield.
- The engraved image of Ulysses S. Grant appears on the 18-cent denomination of the 1938 Presidential Series. Grant's likeness was inspired by a statue by Franklin Simmons, housed in the Rotunda of the United States Capitol.

=== Grant on commemorative issues ===
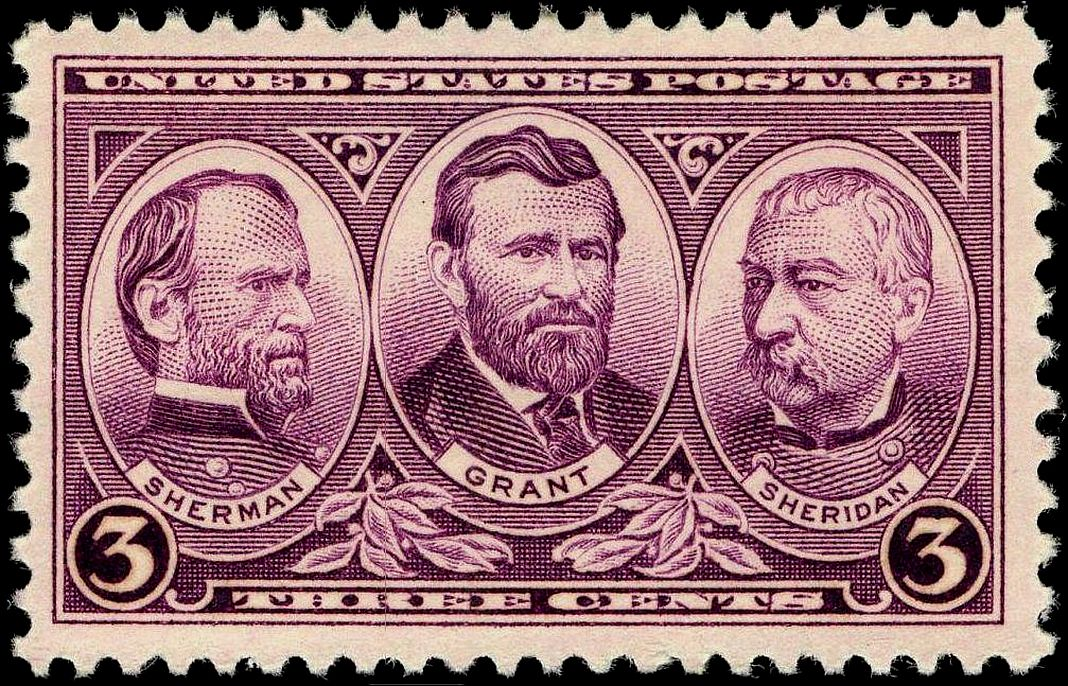
Army Issue of 1937

General Grant taken from Mathew Brady photo on Commemorative Issue of 1995

Grant has appeared three times on commemorative stamps.

- Grant (along with William T. Sherman and Philip H. Sheridan) appears on the 3-cent 1937 Army Issue commemorative stamp issue, one issue out of a set of five stamps among that issue.
- Grant also appears once in the AMERIPEX presidential series, 36 commemorative stamps, issued by the Post Office on May 22, 1986.
- The next commemorative stamp to honor Grant was the 32-cent issue of 1995. Designed by Mark Hess of Katona, the image of Grant was taken from a photo by Mathew Brady in June 1864 at City Point in Virginia. The colorized photo used in the stamp design depicts Grant wearing his Union general's uniform leaning against a post at the encampment.

== Rutherford B. Hayes ==
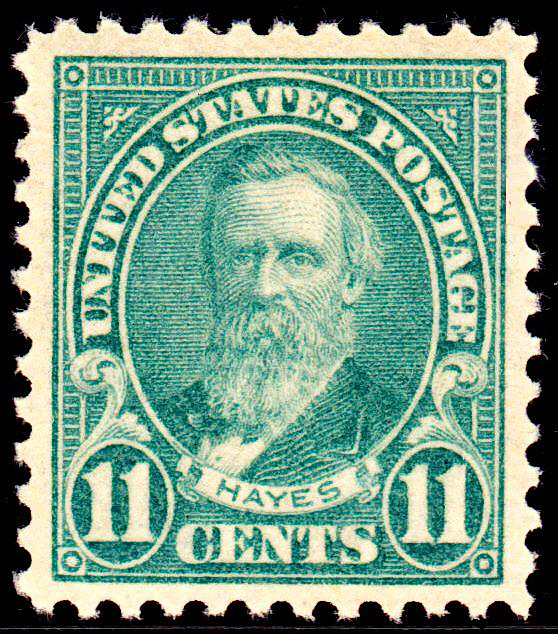
Issue of 1922

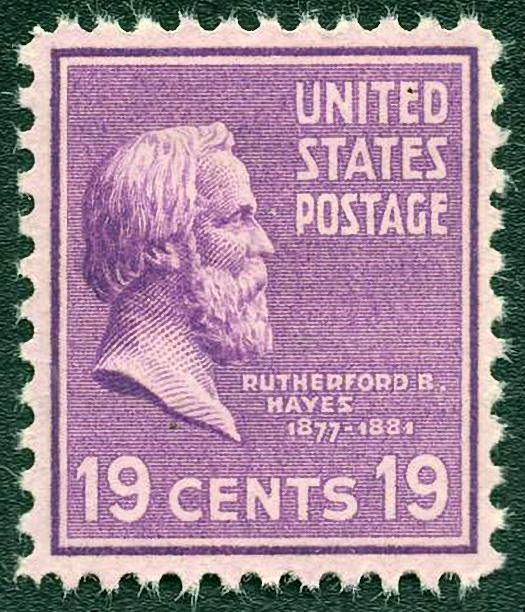
Issue of 1938

Rutherford Birchard Hayes (October 4, 1822 – January 17, 1893) was the 19th president of the United States serving from 1877 to 1881. In the years before his presidency he was the Governor of Ohio for two separate terms. Serving in the Civil War as Brigadier General, Hayes commanded the First Brigade of the Kanawha Division of the Army of West Virginia and turned back several Confederate advances. During his military service he was wounded on five separate incidents.

- An 11¢ stamp was issued on the 100th anniversary of Hayes' birth, October 4, 1922, in Washington, D.C., and in Hayes' hometown, Fremont, Ohio, and was the first stamp issued in the US Regular Issues of 1922–1931. The stamp was designed by Clair Aubrey Huston. The engraving of Hayes is modeled after a photograph taken by Civil War photographer Mathew Brady. John Eissler engraved the die for the vignette.
- Hayes' likeness appears on the 19-cent denomination of the 1938 Presidential Series. Hayes's image was derived from a medal struck by designed by George T. Morgan of the U.S. Mint in Philadelphia. This issue was first released to the public on November 10, 1938, along with the 20-cent Presidential issue of 1938.
- There is only one commemorative stamp honoring Hayes, released in 1986 on the AMERIPEX presidential issue.

== James Garfield ==
James Abram Garfield (November 19, 1831 – September 19, 1881) was the 20th president of the United States from March to September 1881. An assassin's bullet ended his life and presidency and cut his time in office after serving only 200 days. He had a distinguished military background. Garfield served in the United States Army as a major general, as a member of the U.S. House of Representatives, and as a member of the highly controversial Electoral Commission of 1876. He was the second U.S. president to be assassinated. Garfield was the only sitting member of the House of Representatives to have been elected president.

The first issue to honor Garfield was released in 1882, printed by the American Bank Note Company. The 5-cent Garfield was the second U.S. postage stamp to honor an assassinated president within the year following his death and is also considered a 'mourning stamp' by many. Unlike the first Lincoln issue, released after one whole year after his death the 5-cent Garfield stamp was released only seven months after his death in 1881. The 1882 issues were the first issues produced from engravings completed by the American Bank Note Company since it began producing postage stamps for the federal government. Before this time the A.B.N.C. used existing dies using slight changes to frames and portraits that were primarily the National Bank Note Company's design. The re-engraved issues of 1881–1882 are an example.

James A. Garfield Memorial Issues

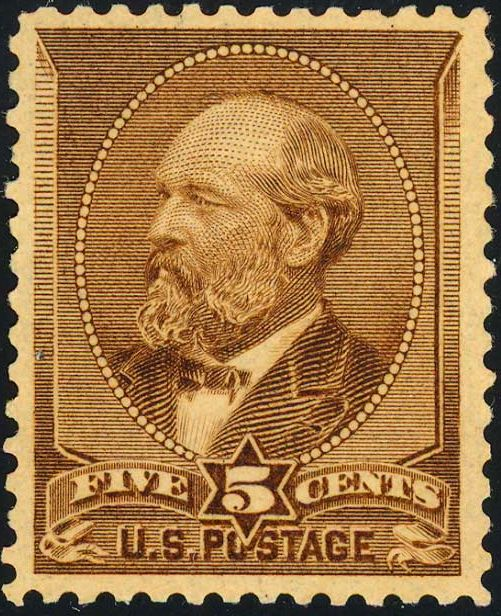
Issue of 1882

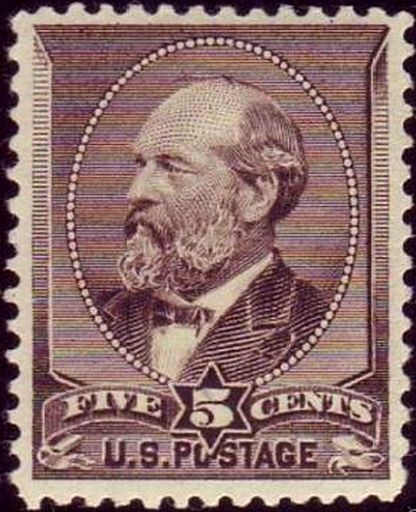
Issue of 1882

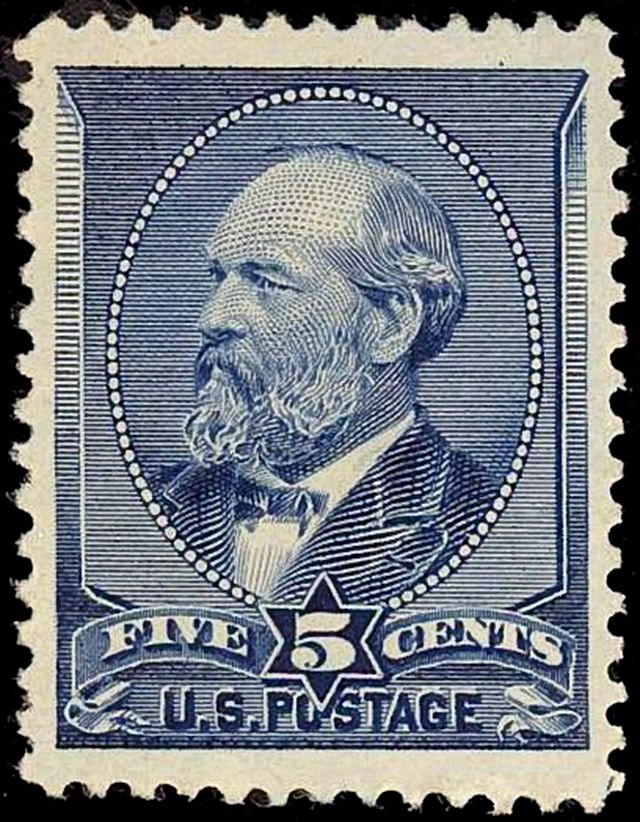
Reprinting of 1888

Issues depicting Garfield released on and after 1894 were printed by the Bureau of Engraving and Printing.

Late 19th century Issues

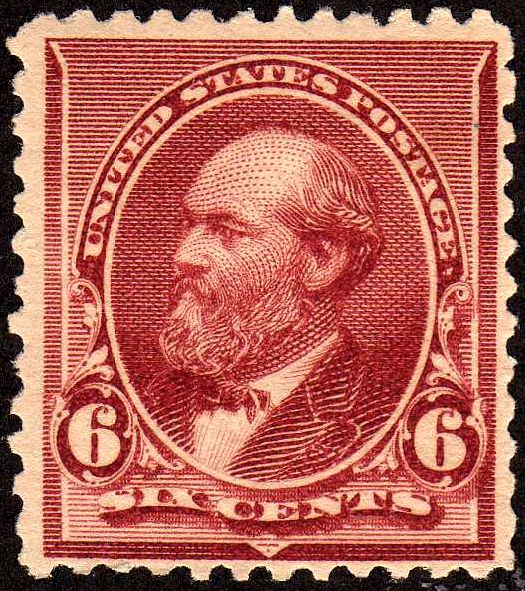
Issue of 1890

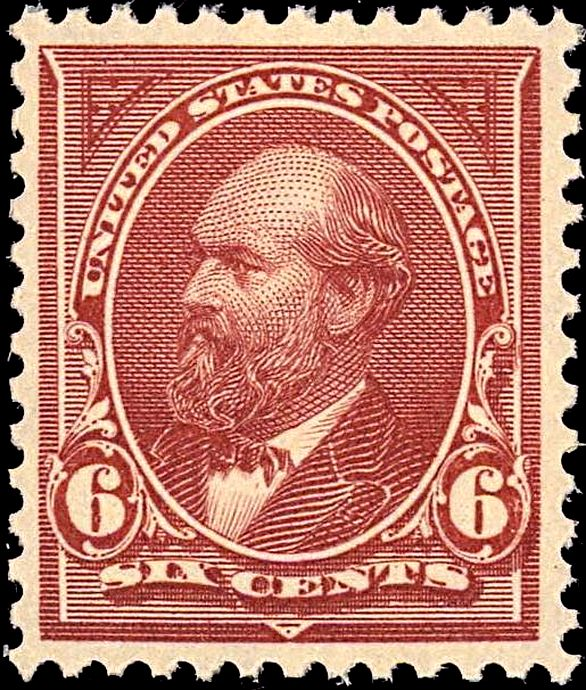
Issue of 1895

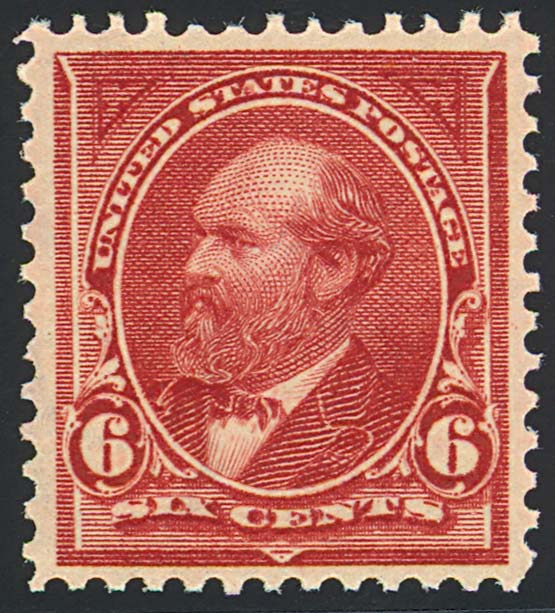
Issue of 1898

The American Bank note issues of 1890 are almost identical to the Bureau Issues that followed in 1894, with minor differences in the frame design.

- American Bank Note Co.
- Bureau Issues

Early 20th century Issues

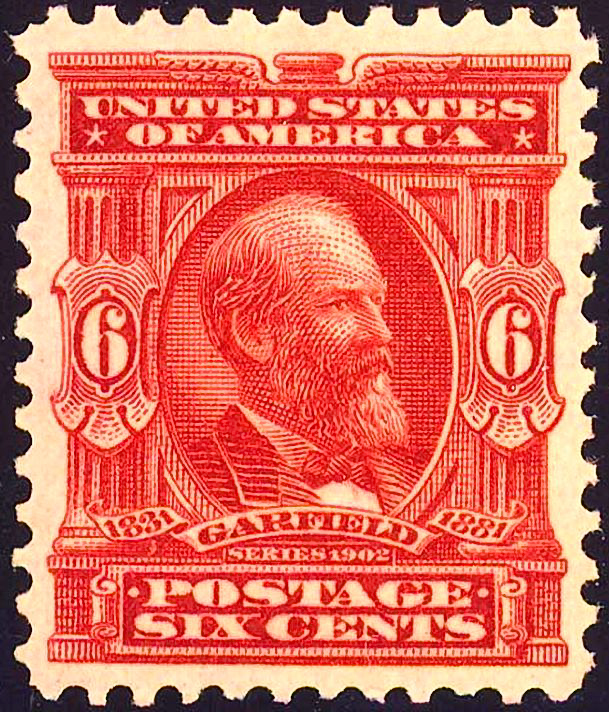
Issue of 1903

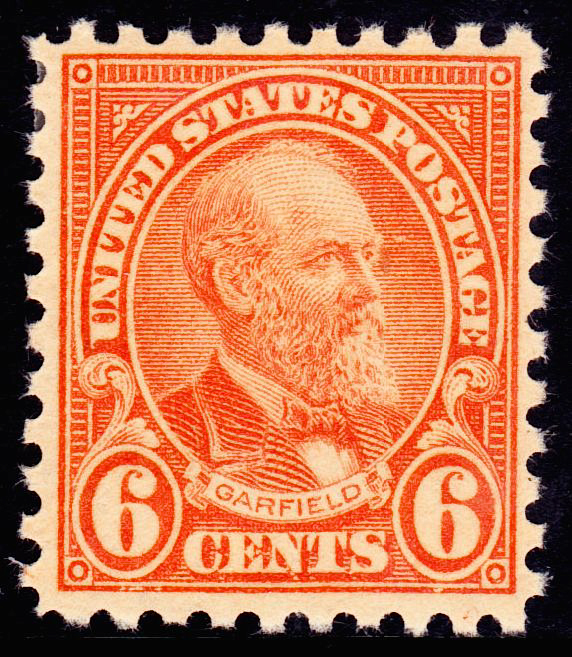
Issue of 1922

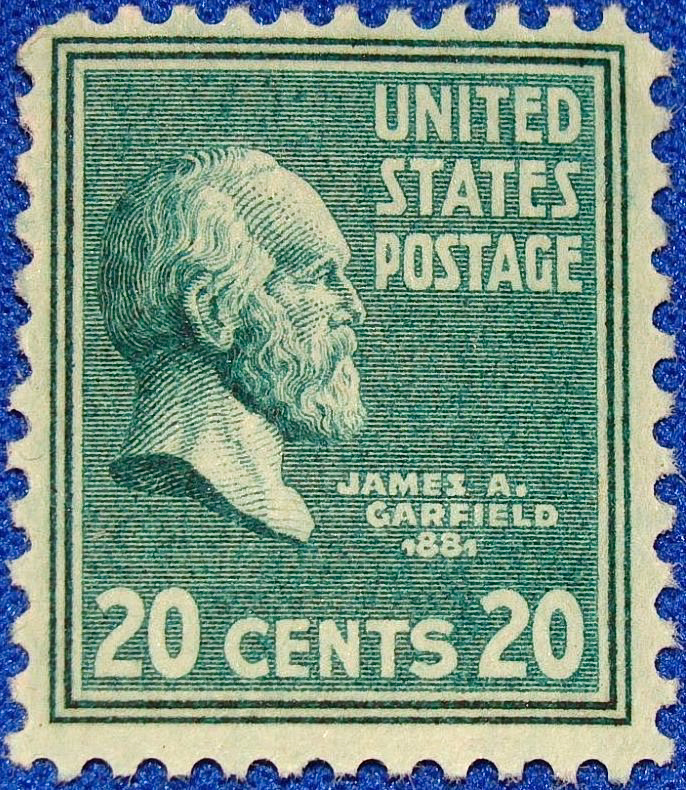
Issue of 1938

- The Regular Issue of 1902–03 stamp was designed by R. Ostrander Smith from a photograph, and was engraved by George F. C. Smillie. It was printed on double-line watermark paper.
- The release of the 6-cent Regular Issue Garfield stamp marked the sixth time Garfield appeared on U.S. postage. Originally slated for release on Garfield's birthday on November 19, a Sunday, when post offices were closed, it was instead released on the 20th in Washington, D.C., as there was no post office in Garfield's hometown of Orange, Ohio at the time this issue was released.
- Garfield's image on the Presidential issue of 1938 was inspired by a medal created by the U.S. Mint. The issue was released to the public on November 10, 1938.
- As of 2011 there is only one commemorative stamp honoring Garfield, released in 1986 on the AMERIPEX presidential issue.

== Chester A. Arthur ==
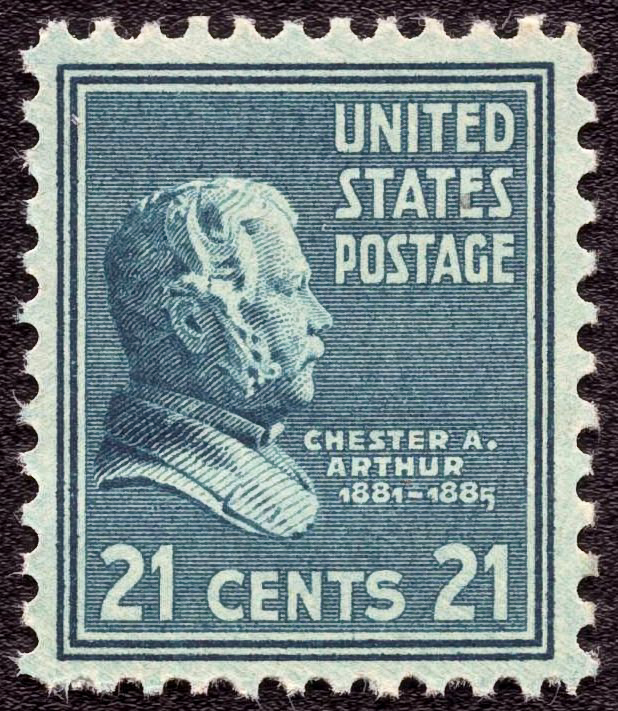
Issue of 1938

Chester Alan Arthur (October 5, 1829 – November 18, 1886) served as the 21st president of the United States from 1881 to 1885. A Republican, Arthur worked as a lawyer before becoming the 20th vice president, under James Garfield. On July 2, 1881, President Garfield was shot and killed by Charles J. Guiteau, but Garfield did not die until September 19 of that year, at which time Arthur was sworn in as president, serving until March 4, 1885.

- The engraving of Chester A. Arthur appears on the 21-cent value of the 1938 Presidential Series, first issued on November 22, 1938. The likeness was modeled after a marble bust of Arthur by Augustus Saint-Gaudens in 1891, now displayed in the US Senate Gallery.
- There is only one commemorative stamp issued in Arthur's honor, one stamp in a series in the AMERIPEX Presidential issue of 1986.

== Grover Cleveland ==
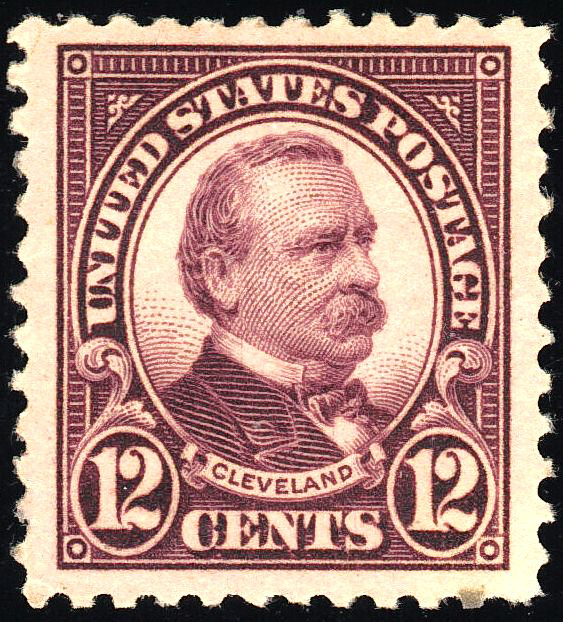
Issue of 1923

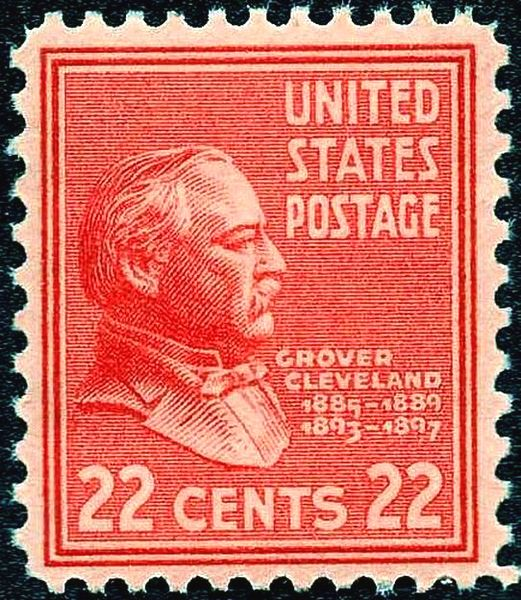
Issue of 1938

Stephen Grover Cleveland (March 18, 1837 – June 24, 1908) was the 22nd and 24th president of the United States. Cleveland is the only dead president ever to have served two non-consecutive terms (1885–1889 and 1893–1897) as president and therefore is the only individual to be counted twice in the numbering of the presidents in terms of stamps.

- On March 20, 1923, the Post Office issued the 12-cent Cleveland issue, first released both in Washington, D.C., and in Caldwell, New Jersey, Cleveland's hometown. Clair Aubrey Huston designed the stamp and John Eissler engraved the portrayal of Cleveland. The model for the engraving is listed by the Bureau of Engraving and Printing as "unknown The 12-cent Cleveland was reprinted and issued again in 1931.
- Cleveland appeared on a 22-cent Presidential Issue stamp released on November 22, 1938, the same day as the 21-cent Arthur stamp of that series. The engraving of Cleveland's portrait was modeled after a medal struck by Charles Barber of the U.S. Mint.
- The 22-cent Cleveland stamp was issued on May 22 of 1986 as part of a series of stamps honoring U.S. presidents, first issued during AMERIPEX '86, the international philatelic show held in Rosemont, Illinois. Artist Jerry Dadds of Baltimore, Maryland, designed the four sheets containing thirty-six stamps. Dadds also executed the designs in the woodcut style.

== Benjamin Harrison ==
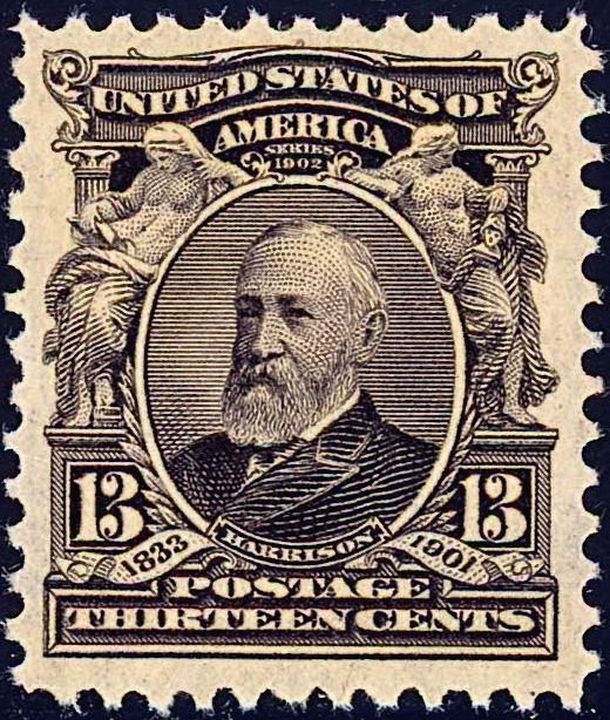
The 1st Harrison stamp Issue of 1902

Benjamin Harrison (August 20, 1833 – March 13, 1901) was the 23rd president of the United States, serving one term from 1889 to 1893. Harrison was born in North Bend, Ohio, and at the age of 21 moved to Indianapolis, Indiana, where he became involved with Indiana state politics. During the American Civil War, Harrison served as a brigadier general in the Army of the Cumberland.

Under Harrison and his postmaster general John Wanamaker, the nation's first commemorative stamps were made available and were first issued at the World Columbian Exposition in Chicago, Illinois, in 1893. Wanamaker originally introduced the idea of issuing the nation's first commemorative stamp to Harrison, the Congress, and the Post Office. Contrary to the general opinion of Congress at the time Wanamaker predicted that commemorative stamps would generate needed revenue for the country. Shortly thereafter, the nation's first commemorative stamps were issued in conjunction with the World Columbian Exposition, both of which were in commemoration of the 400th anniversary of Columbus' discovery of America. To demonstrate his confidence in the new commemorative stamp issues Wanamaker purchased $10,000 worth of stamps with his own money. Harrison was also present at the World Columbian Exposition and ceremony and delivered a speech where he said. "In the name of the Government and of the people of the United States, I do hereby invite all the nations of the earth to take part in the commemoration of an event that is pre-eminent in human history, and of lasting interest to mankind The exposition lasted several months and by the time it was over more than $40 million had been generated in commemorative postage stamp sales alone. From that point onward, the U.S. Post Office would issue commemorative postage on a regular basis. Harrison appears on four regular issues and on two commemorative issues.

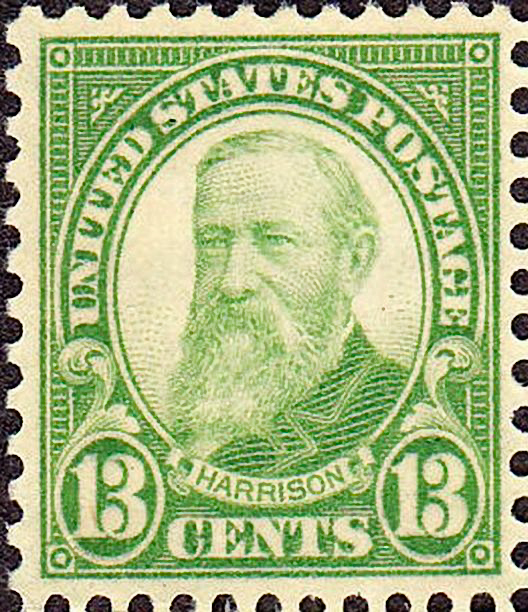
Issue of 1926

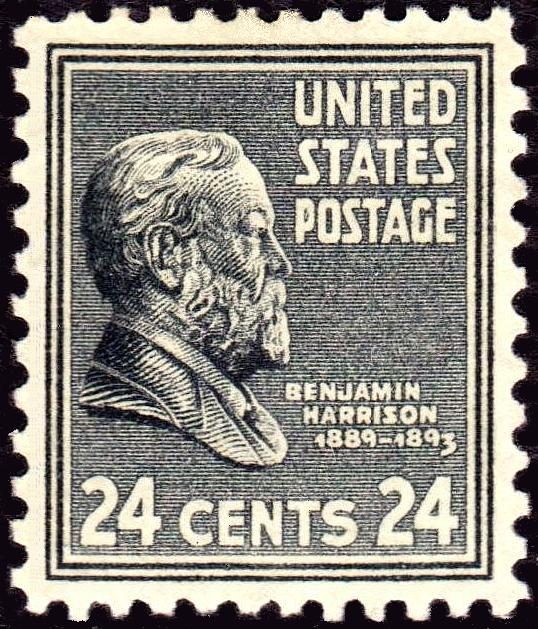
Issue of 1938

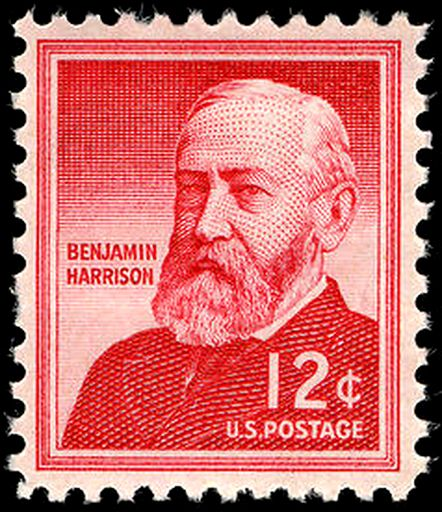
Issue of 1959

- The 1902 13-cent postage stamp was the first issue to honor Benjamin Harrison, issued on November 18, 1902, less than two years after his death. It was the first 13-cent stamp issued by the Post Office, and the first of 14 stamps to be released to the public in the 1902–03 series. The stamp was designed by R. O. Smith from a photograph supplied by Mrs. Harrison. The image was engraved by Marcus W. Baldwin.
- The 1926 issue of Harrison was engraved by Clair Aubrey Huston who based the image design on the same photograph of Harrison that was used to model the 1902 stamp.
- The 24-cent 1938 issue of Harrison image was inspired by a bust by Adolph A. Weinman, on view at the John Herron Art Institute.
- Harrison's image on the 12-cent 1959 issue was taken from a photograph taken by Charles Parker.
- The 22-cent Harrison commemorative stamp was issued on May 22, 1986, as part of a series of stamps honoring U.S. presidents, first issued during AMERIPEX '86, the international philatelic show held in Rosemont, Illinois. Artist Jerry Dadds of Baltimore, Maryland, designed the four sheets containing thirty-six stamps. Dadds also executed the designs in the woodcut style.
- In 2003 the Postal Service issued a 37-cent Old Glory commemorative stamp on April 3, 2003, at the Mega Stamp Show in New York, New York. The stamp was designed by Richard Sheaff. The stamp depicts an 1888 presidential campaign badge with a photograph of Benjamin Harrison at its center.

== William McKinley ==
William McKinley Jr. (January 29, 1843 – September 14, 1901) was the 25th president of the United States from 1897 to 1901, and the last veteran of the American Civil War to be elected to the presidency. He was the last American president to serve in the 19th century and was the first president to serve in the 20th century. He spent much of his adult life in politics and was a six-term congressman, and was also the governor of Ohio before defeating William Jennings Bryan for the Presidency (1897–1901). McKinley was assassinated early in his second term while attending the Pan-American Exposition in Buffalo in 1901.

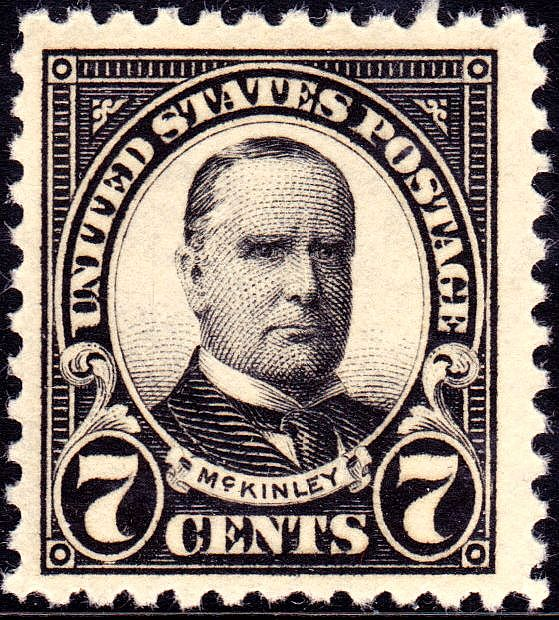
Issue of 1923

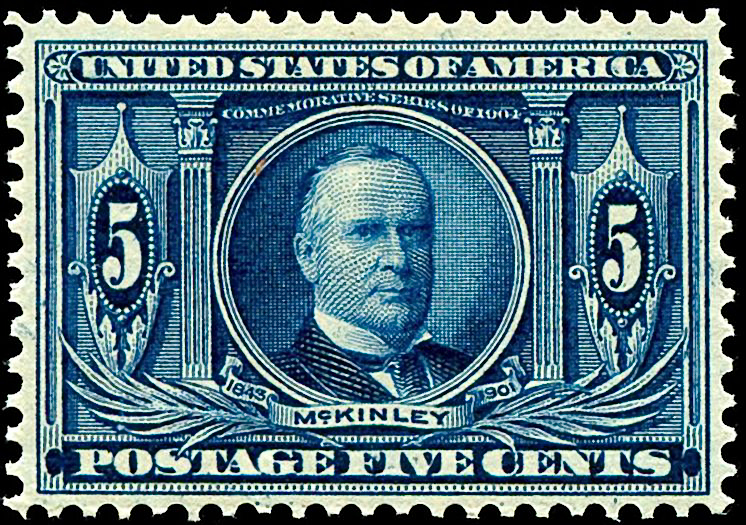
Issue of 1904

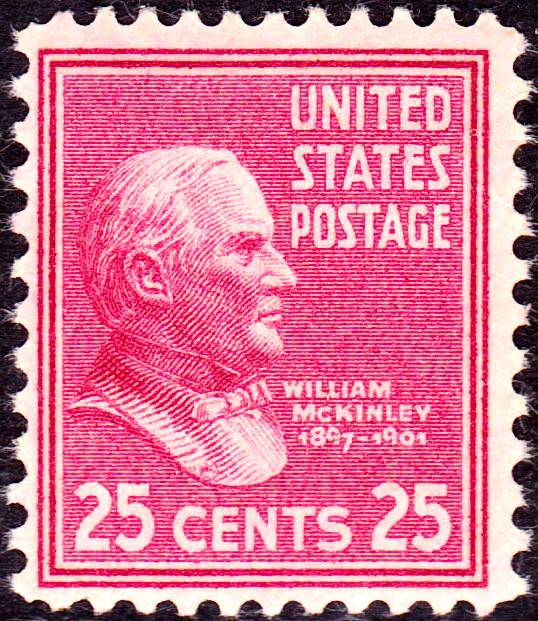
Issue of 1938

- McKinley first appeared on U.S. postage in a commemorative issue, the Louisiana Purchase series of 1904. McKinley is depicted on the Louisiana Purchase issue as he was the president who signed the legislation giving federal sanction to the Exposition and would have presided over the Exposition had he lived. This issue also served as a tribute and memorial to the assassinated leader, as it came out less than three years after his death, in what would have been nearing the end of the second term to which he was elected in 1900.
- William McKinley appears on three Regular Issues of 1923, 1926 and 1927, the design, color and denomination of which are the same, and on the 1938 Presidential issue.
- The Presidential Issue of 1938 features McKinley on the 25-cent issue, released 1938.
- The 22-cent McKinley commemorative stamp was issued on May 22 of 1986 as part of a series of stamps honoring U.S. presidents, first issued during AMERIPEX '86, the international philatelic show held in Rosemont, Illinois. Artist Jerry Dadds of Baltimore, Maryland, designed the four sheets containing thirty-six stamps. Dadds also executed the designs in the woodcut style. It is one among only two commemorative stamps that honor this president.

== Theodore Roosevelt ==
Theodore Roosevelt (October 27, 1858 – January 6, 1919) was the 26th president of the United States from 1901 to 1909. In September 1901, President William McKinley was assassinated, and Roosevelt became president at the age of 42, taking office at the youngest age of any U.S. president in history at that time. Roosevelt was a hero of the Spanish–American War and the Battle of San Juan Hill for which he received the Medal of Honor and was the commander of the legendary Rough Riders. He negotiated an end to the Russo-Japanese War which later won him the Nobel Peace Prize. Roosevelt was the first American to win the Nobel Peace Prize.

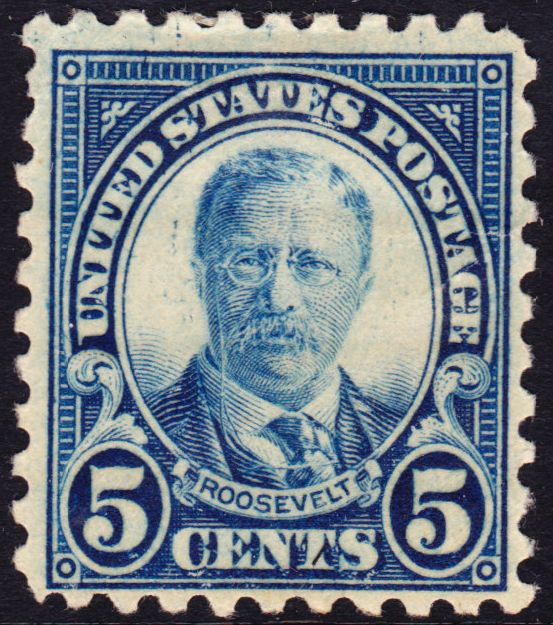
1st Roosevelt stamp Issue of 1925

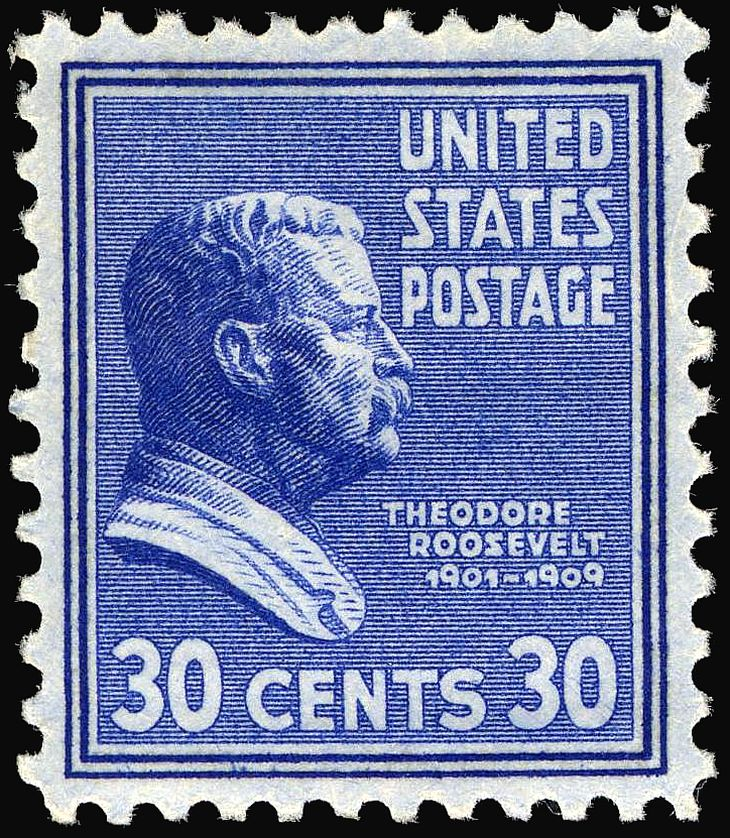
Issue of 1938

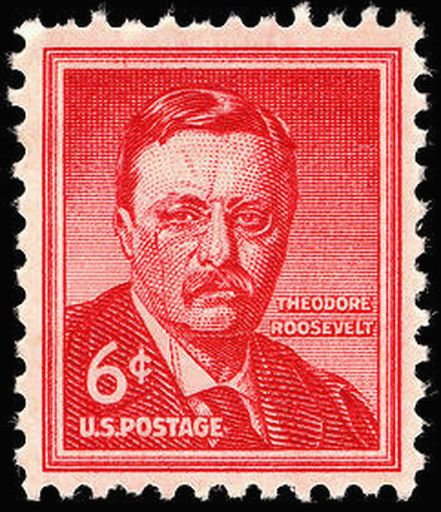
Issue of 1955

- Clair Aubrey Huston designed the 5¢ blue issue of 1922 and 1925 stamp issues (identical except for perforations). The Roosevelt image was engraved by John Eissler, and was modeled after a photograph taken of Roosevelt by the firm of Harris & Ewing in Washington, D.C., in 1907.
- The Presidential Issue of 1938 presented Roosevelt on the 30¢ stamp. The engraving of the president was modeled on a bust displayed in the Senate Gallery US Capitol in Washington, D.C.
- The 6¢ stamp issued in 1955 was designed by Victor S. McCloskey, Jr. and Charles R. Chickering of the Bureau of Engraving and Printing.
- Roosevelt oversaw the construction of the Panama Canal and consequently he later appeared on two Canal Zone postage stamps, printed by the Bureau of Engraving and Printing and issued by the U.S. Government administration offices in the Canal Zone for domestic mail and for outgoing mail. The first Canal Zone stamp to depict the 26th president was issued in 1949.

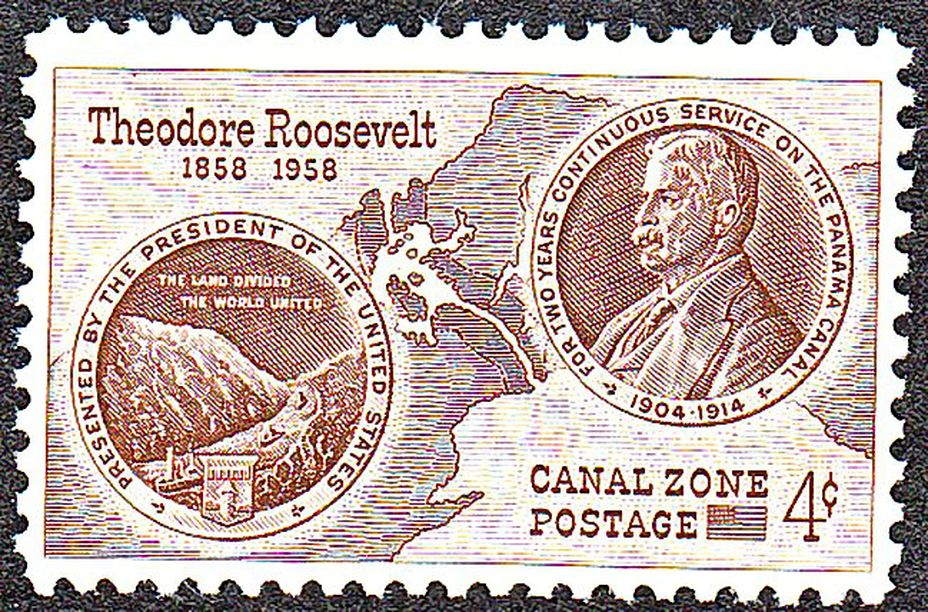
Issue of 1958

- A Canal Zone stamp honoring Roosevelt was issued in November 1958, the 100th anniversary of his birth. Theodore Roosevelt is the only American president to be honored on a Canal Zone postage stamp.
- The 22-cent Roosevelt commemorative stamp was issued on May 22, 1986, as part of a series of stamps honoring U.S. presidents, first issued during AMERIPEX '86, the international philatelic show held in Rosemont, Illinois. Artist Jerry Dadds of Baltimore, Maryland, designed the four sheets containing thirty-six stamps. Dadds also executed the designs in the woodcut style.
- On February 2, 1998, the USPS issued a 32 cent stamp honoring Theodore Roosevelt as part of its Celebrate the Century series.

== William Howard Taft ==
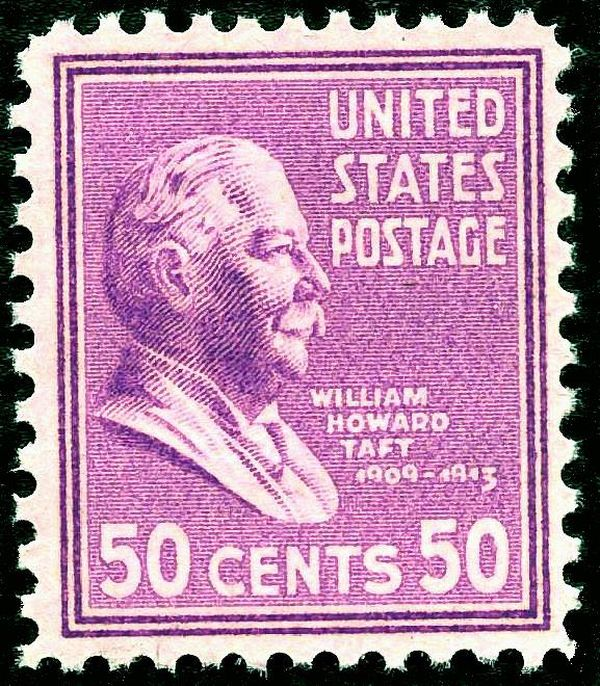
Issue of 1938

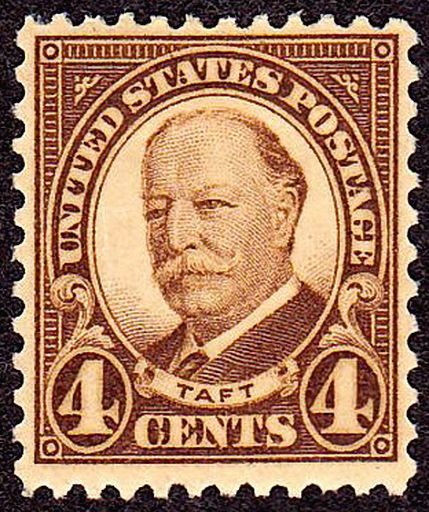
Issue of 1930

William Howard Taft (September 15, 1857 – March 8, 1930) was the 27th president of the United States from 1909 to 1913, and later the 10th Chief Justice of the United States from 1921 to 1930. Taft is the only person to have served in both offices. Born in 1857 in Cincinnati, Ohio, into the powerful Taft family, Taft graduated from Yale College Phi Beta Kappa in 1878, and from Cincinnati Law School in 1880.

- The 4¢ Taft stamp was issued on June 4, 1930, in Taft's hometown of Cincinnati, Ohio, less than three months after Taft's death that year on March 8. This issue of Taft is based on the same design as are the regular issues of 1925–1932, designed by Clair Aubrey Huston. The engraving of Taft is modeled after a photograph taken by Harris & Ewing.
- The 50¢ Taft on the Presidential issue of 1932 was released on December 8, 1938. The engraved profile of Taft was modeled after a bust sculpted especially for the stamp.
- Taft is honored on the AMERIPEX presidential issue of 1986.

== Woodrow Wilson ==
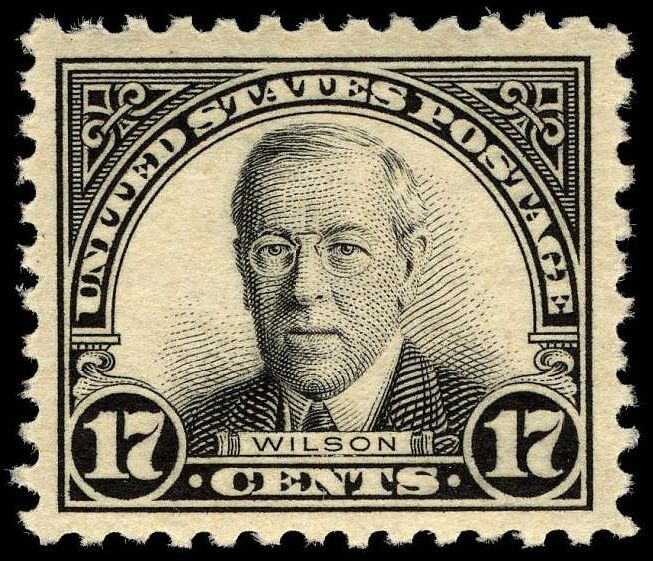
The 1st Wilson stamp Issue of 1925

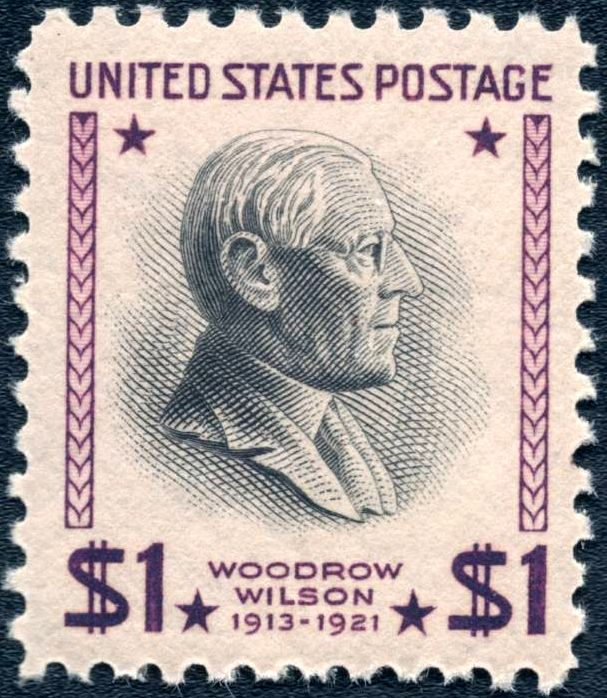
Issue of 1938

Thomas Woodrow Wilson (December 28, 1856 – February 3, 1924) was the 28th president of the United States from 1913 to 1921. First known by the slogan "he kept us out of the war", Wilson was finally pressured into asking Congress to declare war on Germany who was attacking U.S. vessels at high sea.

- Less than a year after the death of Woodrow Wilson, the Post Office issued the black, 17-cent stamp in his honor, on December 28, 1925. Issued in such a timely manner, the 1925 issue can be considered a memorial to Wilson. President Wilson's widow provided the photograph which designer Clair Aubrey Huston used for the overall stamp design and which John Eissler of the Bureau of Engraving and Printing used as the model for the engraving of Wilson.
- On August 29, 1938, the Post Office issued the $1 Wilson stamp as part of the Presidential Issue. The engraved image of Wilson was modeled after a medal designed by George T. Morgan of the U.S. Mint.
- Wilson is honored on the AMERIPEX presidential series, issued in 1986.
- On February 2, 1998, the Postal Service included a Woodrow Wilson stamp as part of its Celebrate the Century series.

== Warren G. Harding ==
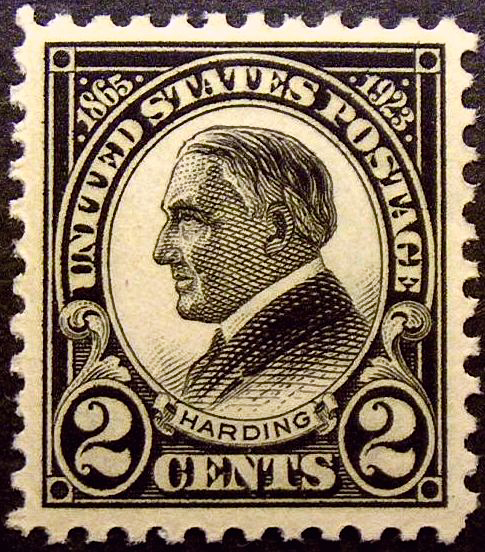
Warren G. Harding Memorial Issue of 1923 Issued only one month after death on Sep 1, 1923 in Harding's hometown of Marion

Warren Gamaliel Harding (November 2, 1865 – August 2, 1923) was the 29th president of the United States, serving from 1921 until his sudden death from a heart attack in 1923. A Republican from Ohio, Harding was once an influential newspaper publisher at the Marion Daily Star. He served in the Ohio Senate (1899–1903) and later as the 28th Lieutenant Governor of Ohio (1903–1905) and as a U.S. Senator (1915–1921).

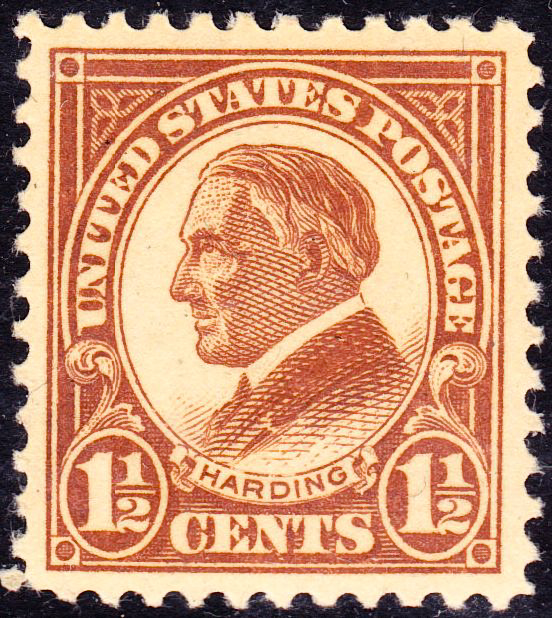
Issue of 1925

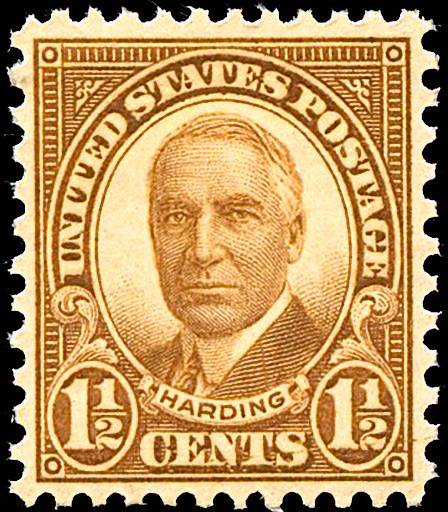
Issue of 1930

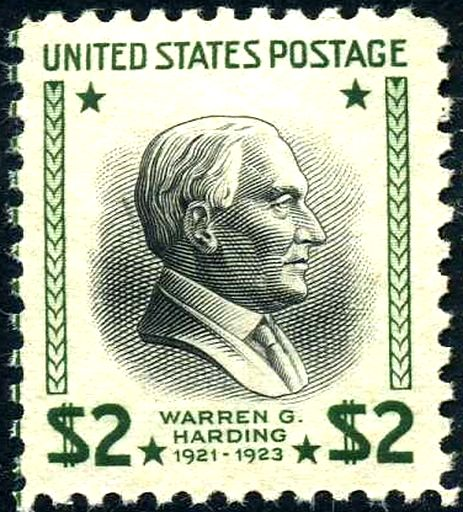
Issue of 1938

- Harding's unexpected death prompted the issue of 1923, 2¢ black, unofficially referred to as the Harding Memorial issue, which Clair Aubrey Huston managed to design in one day. The engraving of Harding was modeled after an etching by artist F. Pauling. Amazingly, the Bureau of Engraving and Printing was able to print over one and one half billion of these stamps in a three-month period.
- Two years later on May 19, 1925, the Post Office issued a similar Harding stamp, using the 1923 memorial issue die, and whose color this time was brown and whose denomination was now at 1½ cents. This stamp was one of 27 definitive stamps issued between 1922 and 1931. Both of these Harding stamps were also issued in imperforate form.
- In 1930 the Post Office issued a new Harding 1½¢ stamp, replacing the earlier profile pose with a full faced portrait.
- The image of Harding also appears on the 2-dollar issue of the 1938 Presidential Series. The engraved image of Harding's likeness was modeled after a medal struck by George Morgan of the U.S. Mint.
- Harding was also honored on the AMERIPEX commemorative stamp issue of 1986, along with all other American presidents up to and including President Lyndon B. Johnson.

== Calvin Coolidge ==
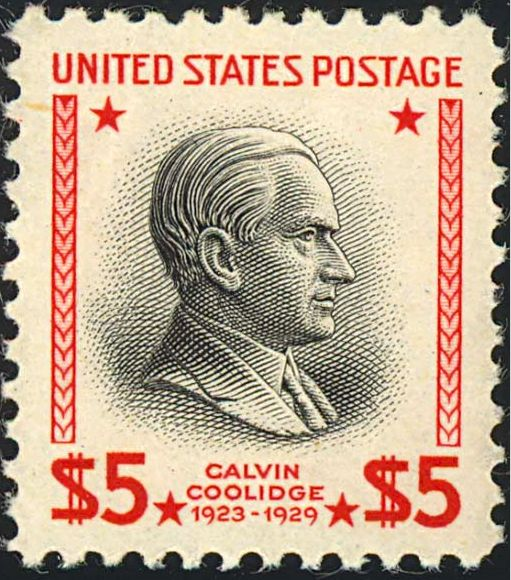
Issue of 1938

John Calvin Coolidge, Jr. (July 4, 1872 – January 5, 1933) from Plymouth, Vermont, was the 30th president of the United States serving from 1923 to 1929. Coolidge became president upon the death of Warren G. Harding. On February 22, 1924, he became the first president of the United States to deliver a political speech on radio, and his 1925 inauguration was the first to be broadcast on radio. He was known as "Silent Cal" for being a man of few words in private while known for being an excellent orator at the pulpit.

- On November 17, 1938, the Post Office issued the 5-dollar value of the Presidential Issue, featuring Coolidge. The model for this engraving was taken from a medal struck by John R. Sinnock of the U.S. Mint. Among the Presidential Issues this stamp is the most difficult to find on cover.
- Coolidge along with all other presidents up to and including President Lyndon Johnson is honored on the 1986 AMERIPEX commemorative issues.

Up through Coolidge, every president (with the two exceptions of Monroe and McKinley) had made his first appearance on U.S. postage in a definitive series, only later being honored by a commemorative stamp. With subsequent presidents, the reverse is true: all have made their first appearances on commemoratives. For all of the later presidents, a commemorative stamp has been issued no later than one year and four days after the president's death.

== Herbert Hoover ==
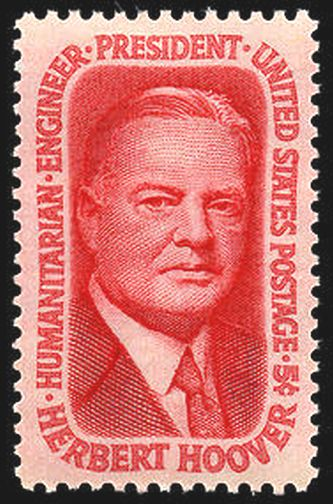
Issue of 1965

Herbert Clark Hoover (August 10, 1874 – October 20, 1964) was the 31st president of the United States serving from 1929 to 1933. Hoover was a professional mining engineer and author. A son of a Quaker blacksmith, Hoover brought to the presidency a reputation for public service as a humanitarian. After World War I, Hoover had massive shipments of food sent to feed starving millions in central Europe. He also provided much needed aid to Soviet Russia in 1921 which was then plagued with famine.

In spite of Hoover's many humanitarian efforts, he is ranked less than favorably as a president among many historians for his failure to bring the country out of the great depression that beset the country in 1929, the year Hoover assumed office. Hoover has never appeared on a U.S. definitive stamp.

- Issued on his birthday, the 5-cent commemorative issue honoring President Herbert Hoover was first placed on sale on August 10, 1965, at West Branch, Iowa, the place of Hoover's birth. The issue was released less than one year after Hoover's passing in 1964. This is the first U.S. postage issue Herbert Hoover has appeared on.
- Hoover appears again on the AMERIPEX series of presidents issued in 1986.

== Franklin D. Roosevelt ==
Franklin Delano Roosevelt (January 30, 1882 – April 12, 1945) was the 32nd president of the United States from 1933 to 1945, and a leading figure in world events during the mid-20th century, leading the United States during a time of worldwide economic crisis and world war. Roosevelt was the only American president elected president for more than two terms. He forged a durable coalition that realigned American politics for decades. In his first "Hundred Days" in office, beginning March 4, 1933, Roosevelt launched a variety of major social programs. In his first term (1933–37), Roosevelt led Congress to enact the New Deal, a large, complex interlocking set of programs designed to produce social and economic relief.

Only two months after Roosevelt's death, the Post Office issued a series of four commemorative (or memorial) stamps in honor and memory of the deceased president.

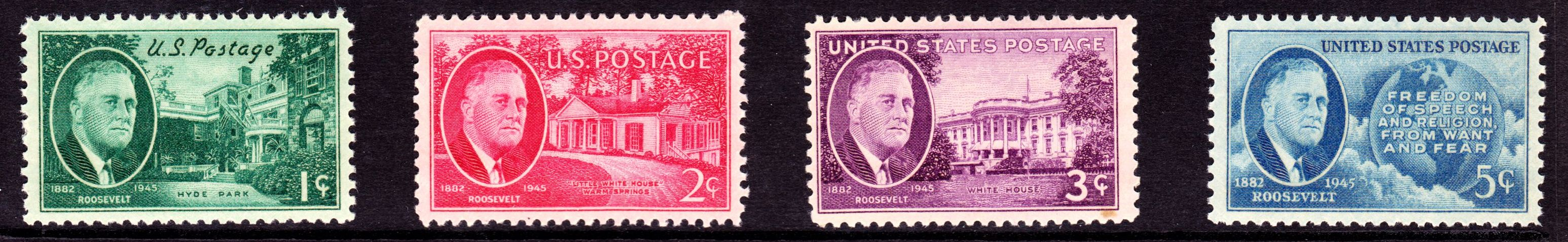
FDR Memorial issues of 1945

- The 1-cent green Franklin D. Roosevelt memorial stamp was issued on July 26, 1945, at the Post Office at Hyde Park, New York. The design depicts an image of the Roosevelt home in Hyde Park, New York.
- The 2¢ red was issued on August 24, 1945, in Warm Springs, Georgia, the site of Roosevelt's favorite retreat, known as the "Little White House".
- Of the four issues in the Franklin memorial series, the 3¢ value was actually the first to be released. The 3¢ purple Roosevelt memorial stamp was issued on June 27, 1945. The design features the White House in the background.
- The 5¢ blue issue is the last of the Roosevelt memorial series, issued on January 30, 1946. The design depicts a portrait of Roosevelt on the left and a globe showing the Americas on the right, both images surrounded by clouds. Inscribed across the globe is an expression of the Four Freedoms — "Freedom of Speech and Religion, From Want and Fear".

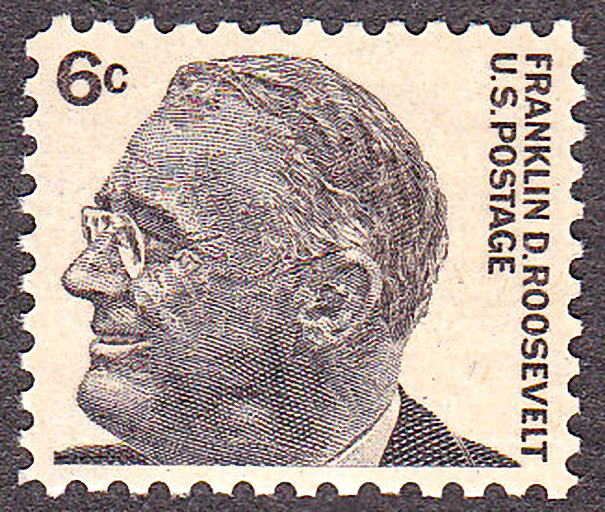
Issue of 1966

Issue of 1982

- The 6¢ issue of 1966 was designed by Richard Lyon Clark and was modeled after a photograph of Roosevelt taken with Winston Churchill during the signing of the Atlantic Charter. This gray brown 6-cent sheet stamp was issued on January 28, 1966, at the Post Office in Hyde Park, New York, the town where the family home is located.
- On January 30, 1982, on the 100th anniversary of his birth a 20-cent commemorative stamp honoring Roosevelt was issued, first released to the public at his birthplace, Hyde Park, New York. The First Day of Issue ceremony was held at the Roosevelt estate, where he and his wife, Eleanor, are buried.
- On September 10, 1998, a 32-cent commemorative was issued in Roosevelt's honor. The issue depicts Roosevelt at a microphone during one of the "fireside chats" for which the president was famous.
- Roosevelt was honored on the AMERIPEX commemorative stamp issue of 1986 along with all other presidents up to and including Lyndon Johnson.

== Harry S. Truman ==
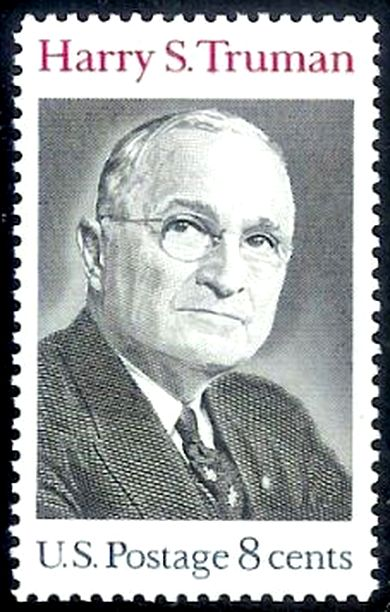
Issue of 1973

Harry S. Truman (May 8, 1884 – December 26, 1972) was the 33rd president of the United States serving from 1945 to 1953. As President Franklin D. Roosevelt's third vice-president and the 34th vice president of the United States, he succeeded to the presidency on April 12, 1945, when President Roosevelt died less than three months after beginning his historic fourth term. Truman began his political career in politics as a county judge in 1922. He was Franklin D. Roosevelt's running mate in 1944.

- The 8-cent Harry S. Truman postage stamp was designed by Bradbury Thompson and first placed on sale at the Post Office at Independence, Missouri, on May 8, 1973.
- The 20-cent Truman definitive stamp was issued on January 26, 1984, in Washington, D.C., honoring the centennial of his birth.
- Truman appeared on a 22-cent stamp as part of the AMERIPEX commemorative stamp issue of 1986.
- On September 2, 1995, the Postal Service issued a 32-cent stamp showing Truman announcing Japan's surrender as part of its World War II 50th anniversary series.
- Truman was depicted on a 33-cent stamp issued on February 18, 1999, as part of the Celebrate the Century series.

== Dwight D. Eisenhower ==
Dwight David Eisenhower (October 14, 1890 – March 28, 1969) was a five-star general in the United States Army and the 34th president of the United States, serving from 1953 until 1961. During World War II, he served as Supreme Commander of the Allied forces in Europe and planned the successful invasion of France and Germany in 1944–45, from the Western Front. In 1951, he became the first supreme commander of NATO.

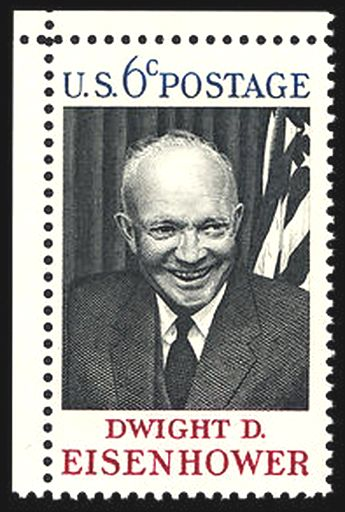
Issue of 1969

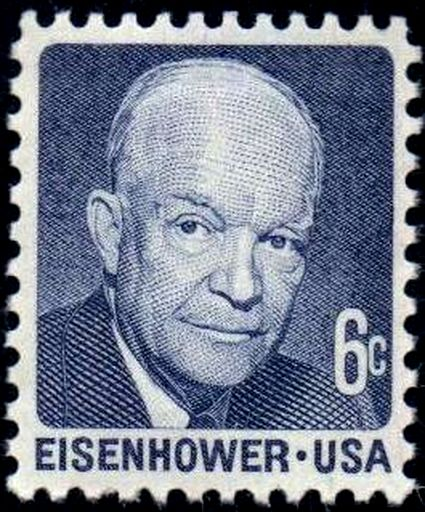
Issue of 1970

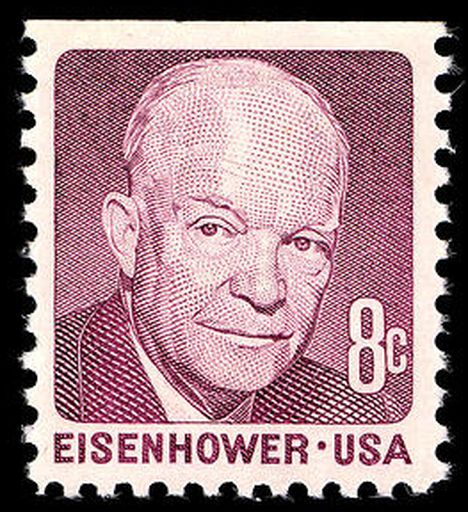
Issue of 1971

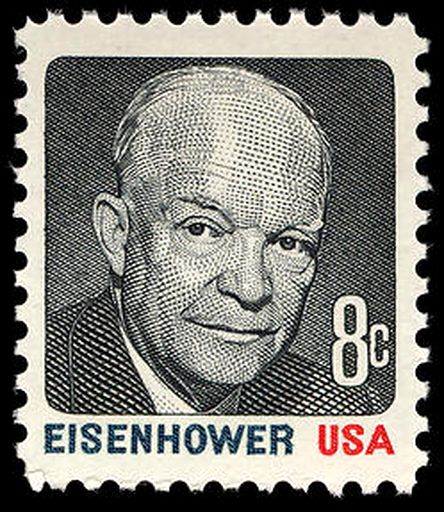
Issue of 1971

- On October 14, 1969, the Post Office issued a 6-cent commemorative stamp honoring President Dwight D. Eisenhower, introduced at Abilene, Kansas, the city where he spent his youth and was eventually buried. Uncommonly larger than the standard commemorative sizes of 1½″ × 1″, this issue's size was 2″ × 1¼. The Eisenhower commemorative issue was designed by Robert J. Jones of the Bureau of Engraving and Printing and was fashioned after a photograph taken by Bernie Noble of the Cleveland Press.
- On August 6, 1970, the Post Office began releasing the Regular issues of 1970–1974. President Eisenhower is depicted on the 6¢ denomination of these issues.
- On May 16, 1971, the domestic first-class letter rate increased to 8 cents, so the 6-cent Eisenhower stamp was re-engraved with the new 8-cent denomination. The stamp was issued in sheet, coil, and booklet formats. The red and black stamp was the only multicolored stamp of the Prominent Americans Issue. The coil and booklet issues were mono-colored claret stamps printed on the Huck/Cottrell web mono-color intaglio presses. Two varieties exist, one with a dot between "Eisenhower" and "USA" and one without. Both were issued in large numbers.
- Eisenhower, along with all other presidents up to and including Lyndon Johnson, was honored on the AMERIPEX commemorative issue of 1986.
- The Postal Service issued a 25¢ stamp on October 13, 1990, in Abilene, Kansas. The central image is taken from the official White House portrait, while background depicts a younger Eisenhower as a general, speaking to Allied troops on the eve of D-Day, the Normandy invasion in 1944. The stamp was designed by Ken Hodges of the American Bank Note Company

== John F. Kennedy ==
John Fitzgerald Kennedy (May 29, 1917 – November 22, 1963), was the 35th president of the United States, serving from 1961 until his assassination in 1963. Few American presidents have quotes that are remembered long after their deaths, and Kennedy was among those few for saying to the nation, "Ask not what your country can do for you; ask what you can do for your country He was the second-youngest president (after Theodore Roosevelt). Kennedy was faced with a number of important events during his term as president which include the Cuban Missile Crisis, the Bay of Pigs Invasion, the Space Race and the Berlin Wall crisis.

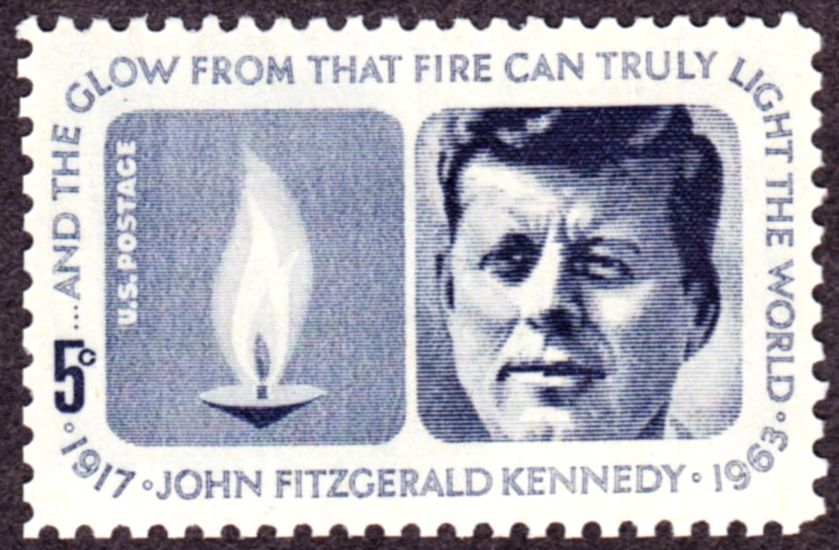
Issue of 1964

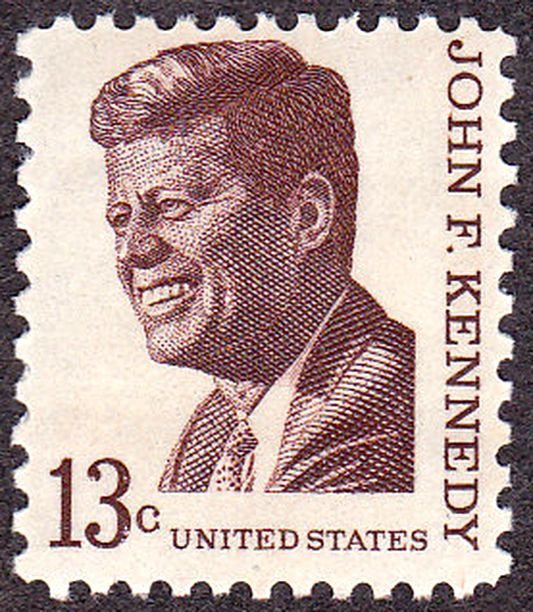
Issue of 1967

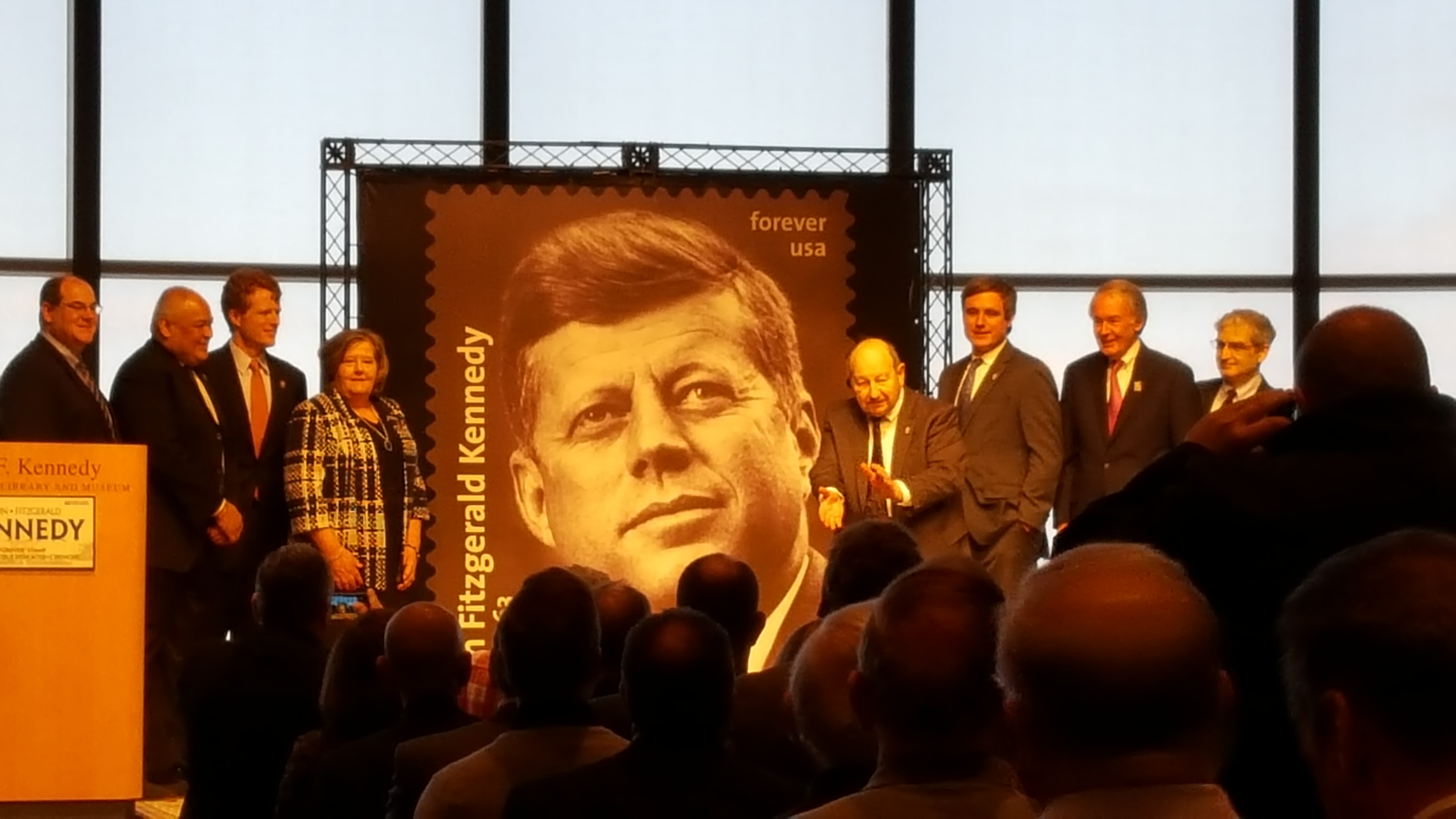
The dedication of a new Forever stamp to honor what would be President John F. Kennedy's 100th birthday.

- On May 29, 1964, the Post Office released the 5¢ John F. Kennedy memorial stamp on what would have been Kennedy's 47th birthday. The issue was designed by Raymond Loewy/William Snaith, a New York firm, based on a sketch by the Bureau of Engraving and Printing artist Robert L. Miller. Jacqueline Kennedy made the final selection from the many postage stamp designs that were submitted.
- The 13-cent issue of 1967 was first issued in Brookline, Massachusetts, on May 29 of that year, on what would have been Kennedy's 50th birthday. The issue was designed by Stevan Dohanos, modeled after a photograph by Jacques Loew in the book The Kennedy Years. The 13-cent Kennedy stamp paid the rates for both foreign surface letters and air postcards.
- Kennedy, like all other presidents up to and including President Lyndon Johnson, was honored on the AMERIPEX commemorative issue of 1986.
- On February 20, 2017, the USPS introduced a new forever stamp dedicated to the 100th anniversary of John F. Kennedy's birth. The stamp is a black-and-white photograph taken by Ted Spiegel during a campaign stop in Seattle during the 1960 presidential election.

== Lyndon B. Johnson ==
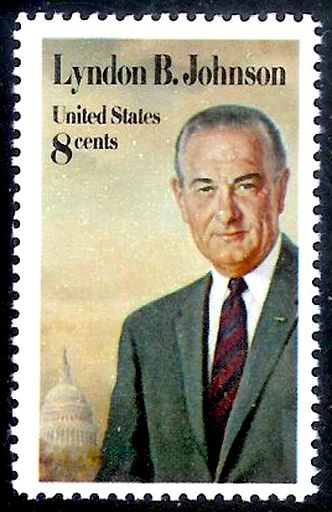
Issue of 1973

Lyndon B. Johnson (August 27, 1908 – January 22, 1973) was the 36th president of the United States from 1963 to 1969 and served as vice president during the Kennedy administration. When Kennedy was assassinated in Dallas, Texas, on November 22, 1963, Johnson assumed the presidency. He won election to a full term, in 1964 with 61 percent of the vote and served until January 20, 1969.

- On August 27, 1973, the US Post Office issued the 8-cent Lyndon B. Johnson memorial postage stamp, first placed on sale at the Post Office in Austin, Texas. The stamp was designed by Bradbury Thompson.
- Johnson's last appearance (to date) on a U.S. postage stamp occurred in 1986 when he was honored on one of the AMERIPEX issues of 1986.

== Richard M. Nixon ==
Issue of 1995

Richard Milhous Nixon, (January 9, 1913 – April 22, 1994) was the 37th president of the United States from 1969 to 1974. Nixon's political career started as a California representative. He was Dwight D. Eisenhower's vice president for two terms and was defeated in 1960 by John F. Kennedy for the presidential election. In 1968, Nixon won the presidency and was overwhelmingly re-elected in 1972. Nixon was the only person to be elected twice to both the presidency and the vice presidency. He was also the only U.S. president to resign the office. Nixon was instrumental in ending U.S. involvement in the Vietnam War and establishing U.S. relations with communist China.

- On April 26, 1995, one year and four days after his death, the Postal Service honored Richard Nixon with the issuance of a 32-cent commemorative stamp, first released in Yorba Linda, California, the place of his birth, to date the only U.S. stamp depicting Nixon. The issue was designed by Daniel Schwarz, and printed in combination offset-intaglio process by the Banknote Corporation of America.

== Gerald Ford ==
Issue of 2007

Gerald Rudolph Ford, Jr. (born Leslie Lynch King, Jr.; July 14, 1913 – December 26, 2006) was the 38th president of the United States, serving from 1974 to 1977, and the 40th vice president of the United States serving from 1973 to 1974. Ford was the first person appointed to the vice presidency under the terms of the 25th Amendment, filling the vacancy left by Spiro Agnew's resignation. He became president upon Richard Nixon's resignation on August 9, 1974.

- A 41-cent Gerald Ford memorial commemorative stamp was issued on August 31, 2007, in Grand Rapids, Michigan, and Palm Springs, California. The stamp featured a portrait of Ford painted by Michael J. Deas.

== Jimmy Carter ==
Issue of 2025

James Earl Carter Jr. (October 1, 1924 - December 29, 2024) was the 39th president of the United States, serving one term from 1977 to 1981. Prior to being president, he was the 76th governor of Georgia from 1971 to 1975. After his presidency, he established the Carter Center to promote human rights and won the 2002 Nobel Peace Prize.

- The U.S. Postal Service issued a "forever" commemorative stamp at the Carter Center in Atlanta, Georgia, on October 1, 2025, what would have been Carter's 101st birthday. The stamp art is a 1982 oil painting by Herbert E. Abrams.

== Ronald Reagan ==
Issue of 2005

Issue of 2011

Ronald Wilson Reagan (February 6, 1911 – June 5, 2004) was the 40th president of the United States and served two terms from 1981 to 1989, and the 33rd governor of California (1967–1975). Born in Tampico, Illinois, Reagan was an actor before going into politics. He has been honored on three commemorative stamps.

- The U.S. Postal Service issued a 37-cent Ronald Reagan commemorative stamp on February 9, 2005. The first day of issue occurred in Simi Valley, California. The stamp design is by Howard E. Paine of Delaplane, Virginia. The image of Reagan was modeled after a portrait painted by award-winning artist Michael J. Deas. On June 14, 2006, this stamp was reissued with a 39-cent valuation to match the new first-class postage rate.
- To mark the centennial of Reagan's birth, the U.S. Postal Service issued a "forever" commemorative stamp to be officially released at the Reagan Presidential Library in Simi Valley on February 10, 2011. Texas artist Bart Forbes created the portrait, based on a 1985 photograph of Reagan taken at Reagan's ranch, Rancho del Cielo, near Santa Barbara.

== George H. W. Bush ==
Issue of 2019

George Herbert Walker Bush (June 12, 1924 – November 30, 2018) was the 41st president of the United States, serving one term from 1989 to 1993. Before his election as president, Bush had been the 43rd vice president of the United States, serving from 1981 to 1989. Earlier, he had been a United States representative from Texas and served in other positions including United States ambassador to the United Nations and Director of Central Intelligence. After Bush's death in 2018, a "forever" commemorative stamp honoring him was released on June 12, 2019, which would have been his 95th birthday.

== AMERIPEX issues of 1986 ==
AMERIPEX issues of 1986

On May 22, 1986, the Postal Service released a series of postage stamps with a portrait of a past U.S. president inscribed upon each one. The series of 36 stamps were issued in a set of four separate mini-sheets, with nine stamps to the sheet, each stamp having a denomination of 22 cents. All of the presidents who were deceased at the time were included (the first 35 men who served as president, through Lyndon Johnson), and several of the issues honor presidents who had never appeared on a U.S. commemorative stamp before. On 'sheet IV' the stamp in the middle depicts the White House entrance.

== See also ==
- First US Postage stamps
- Washington–Franklin Issues
- Washington–Franklins chart
- US Regular Issues of 1922–1931
- Gilbert Stuart
- 1932 Washington Bicentennial
- Clair Aubrey Huston, American stamp designer.
- Bicentennial Series
- Presidential Issue
- Presidential memorials in the United States
- Great Americans series
- Liberty Issue
- List of artworks on stamps of the United States
- List of presidents of the United States
- Postage stamps and postal history of the United States
- Postage stamps and postal history of the Confederate States
- Prominent Americans series
- Washington on official War Dept stamp, 1873 issue
- Commemoration of the American Civil War on postage stamps
- History of Virginia on stamps
U.S. Postage stamp locator

== Bibliography ==
- The American Philatelist. Philadelphia: American Philatelic Association. 1890.
- Jones, William A. (2010). Kloetzel, James E. (ed.). Scott Specialized Catalogue of United States Stamps and Covers. Scott Publishing Company. ISBN 978-0-89487-446-8.
