= Postage stamps and postal history of India =

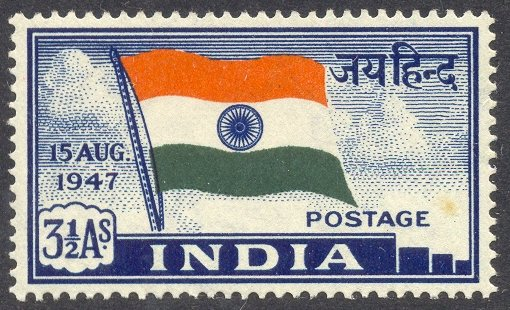
The first stamp of independent India shows the new Indian Flag. It was meant for foreign correspondence.

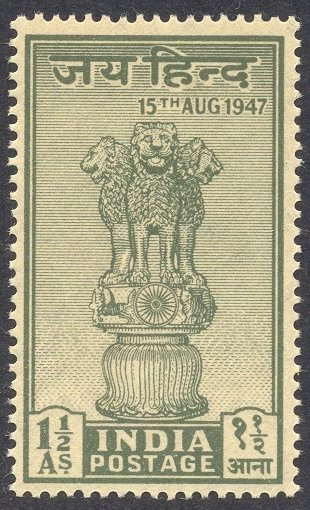
The second stamp depicts the Aśokan lions capital, the National Emblem of India, and was for domestic use.

Indian postal systems for efficient military and governmental communications had developed long before the arrival of Europeans. When the Portuguese, Dutch, French, Danish and British conquered the Marathas who had already defeated the Mughals, their postal systems existed alongside those of many somewhat independent states. The British East India Company gradually annexed the other powers on the sub-continent and brought into existence a British administrative system over most of modern-day India, with a need to establish and maintain both official and commercial mail systems.

Although the Indian Post Office was established in 1837, Asia's first adhesive stamp, the Scinde Dawk, was introduced in 1852 by Sir Bartle Frere, the East India Company's administrator of the province of Sind. The Indian postal system developed into an extensive, dependable and robust network providing connectivity to almost all parts of India, Burma, the Straits Settlements and other areas controlled by the East India Company (EIC). Based on the model postal system introduced in England by the reformer, Rowland Hill, efficient postal services were provided at a low cost and enabled the smooth commercial, military and administrative functioning of the EIC and its successor, the British Raj. The Imperial Posts co-existed with the several postal systems maintained by various Indian states, some of which produced stamps for use within their respective dominions, while British Indian postage stamps were required for sending mail beyond the boundaries of these states. Telegraphy and telephony made their appearance as part of the Posts before becoming separate departments. After the independence of India in 1947, the Indian postal service continues to function on a countrywide basis and provides many valuable, low cost services to the public of India. Pakistan has also had its own postal service since 1947, Burma since 1948, and Bangladesh since 1971.

== Postal history of India ==
=== Ancient and medieval India ===
The history of India's postal system begins long before the introduction of postage stamps. The antecedents have been traced to the systems of the Persian Empire instituted by Cyrus the Great and Darius I for communicating important military and political information. The Atharvaveda (or Arthveda) which is one of the oldest books in the world, records a messenger service in ancient India millenniums ago. Systems for collecting information and revenue data from the provinces are mentioned in Chanakya's Arthashastra (meaning military strategy and skill)(c. 3rd century BCE).

In ancient times the kings (or Raja), emperors (or Maharaja), rulers, zamindars (or the feudal lords) protected their land through the intelligence services of specially trained police or military agencies and courier services to convey and obtain information through runners, messengers and even through pigeons in most parts of India. The chief of the secret service, known as the Daakpaal (postmaster), maintained the lines of communication ... The people used to send letters to [their] distant relatives through their friends or neighbors.

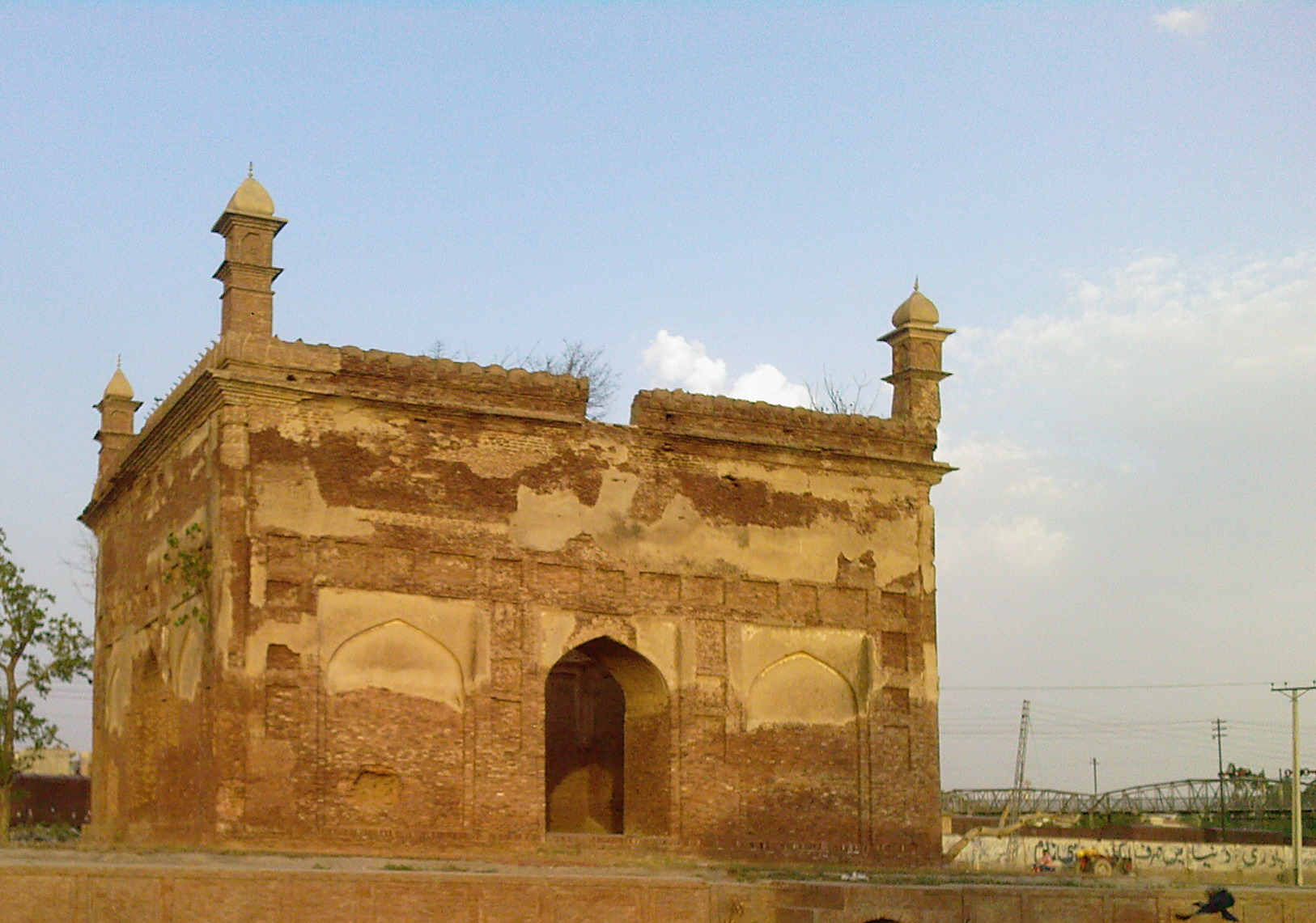
Dak Chowki of Sher Shah Suri's period, Wazirabad, Punjab, Pakistan

The first Sultan of Delhi, before the Mughals colonised India, Qutb-ud-din Aybak was Sultan for only four years, 1206–1210, but he founded the Mamluk Dynasty and created a messenger post system. This was expanded into the dak chowkis, a horse and foot runner service, by Alauddin Khalji in 1296. Sher Shah Suri (1541–1545) replaced runners with horses for conveyance of messages along the northern Indian high road, today known as the Grand Trunk Road, which he constructed between Bengal and Sindh over an ancient trade route at the base of the Himalayas, the Uttarapatha. He also built 1700 'serais' where two horses were always kept for the despatch of the Royal Mail. Akbar introduced camels in addition to the horses and runners.

In the South of India, in 1672 Raja Chuk Deo of Mysore began an efficient postal service which was further improved upon by Haider Ali.

=== Posts and the East India Company ===
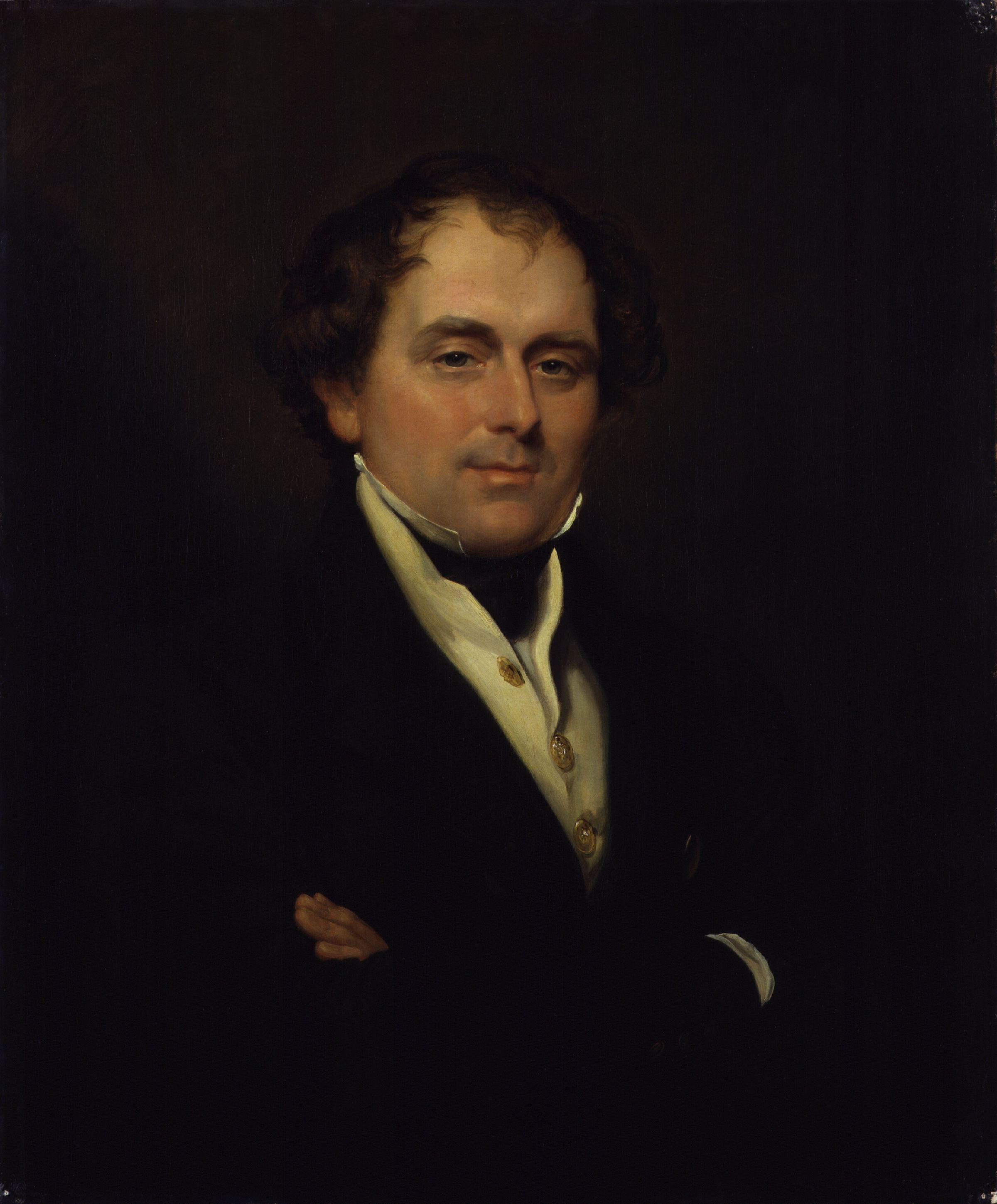
Thomas Waghorn, c. 1847, by Sir George Hayter

The East India Company took constructive steps to improve the existing postal systems in India when, in 1688, they opened a post office in Bombay followed by similar ones in Calcutta and Madras. Lord Clive further expanded the services in 1766 and in 1774 Warren Hastings made the services available to the general public. The fee charged was two annas per 100 miles. The postmarks applied on these letters are very rare and are named 'Indian Bishop Marks' after Colonel Henry Bishop, the Postmaster General of the United Kingdom who introduced this practice in Britain. The Post Office Department of the East India Company was first established on 31 March 1774 at Calcutta, followed in 1778 at Madras and in 1792 at Bombay. After 1793, when Cornwallis introduced the Regulation of the Permanent Settlement, the financial responsibility for maintaining the official posts rested with the zamindars. Alongside these, private dawk mail systems sprang up for the commercial conveyance of messages using hired runners. Also, the East India Company created its own infrastructure for the expansion and administration of military and commercial power. The runners were paid according to the distance they travelled and the weight of their letters.

Carrying the mail was dangerous work:

With the exception of such parts as may be infested by tigers, the post seldom or never fails of arriving within an hour of its appointed time, except, as has been observed, when the waters are out. In this case, many circuitous roads must be followed, whereby the way is considerably lengthened. Taking the average, a hundred miles per day may be run over by the dawk, or post, in fair weather. Each mail-bag is conveyed by an hurkaru (or runner) who is attended by one or two doogy-wallahs, or drummers, who keep up a kind of long-roll, as they pass any suspicious place.

The Post Office Act XVII of 1837 provided that the Governor-General of India in Council had the exclusive right of conveying letters by post for hire within the territories of the East India Company. Section XX required all private vessels to carry letters at prescribed rates for postage. A handstamp was applied to preadhesive ship letters. The mails were available to certain officials without charge, which became a controversial privilege as the years passed. On this basis the Indian Post Office was established on 1 October 1837.

The urgent European mails were carried overland via Egypt at the isthmus of Suez. This route, pioneered by Thomas Waghorn, linked the Red Sea with the Mediterranean, and thence by steamer via Marseille, Brindisi or Trieste to European destinations. The Suez Canal did not open until much later (17 November 1869). The time in transit for letters using the Overland Mail route was dramatically reduced. Waghorn's route reduced the journey from 16,000 miles via the Cape of Good Hope to 6,000 miles; and reduced the time in transit from three months to between 35 and 45 days.

=== The Scinde District Dawk ===
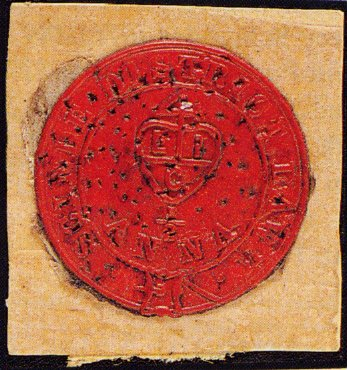
1852 red sealing wafer Scinde Dawk, Asia's first adhesive stamp

The use of the Scinde Dawk adhesive stamps to signify the prepayment of postage began on 1 July 1852 in the Scinde/Sindh district, as part of a comprehensive reform of the district's postal system. A year earlier Sir Bartle Frere had replaced the postal runners with a network of horses and camels, improving communications in the Indus river valley to serve the military and commercial needs of the British East India Company.

The new stamps were embossed individually onto paper or a wax wafer. The shape was circular, with "SCINDE DISTRICT DAWK" around the rim and the British East India Company's Merchant's Mark as the central emblem. The paper was either white or greyish white. The blue stamp was printed onto the paper by the die during the embossing, while the wax version was embossed on a red sealing wax wafer on paper; but all had the same value of 1/2 anna. They were used until October 1854, and then officially suppressed. These are quite scarce today, with valuations from US$700 to $10,000 for postally used examples. The unused red stamp was previously valued at £65,000.00 by Stanley Gibbons (basis 2006); however, it now appears that no unused examples have survived.

=== 1854 reforms and the first issues ===
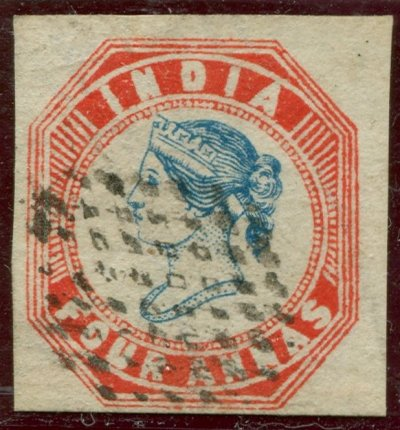
4 annas, 1854

The first stamps valid for postage throughout India were placed on sale in October 1854 with four values: 1/2 anna, 1 anna, 2 annas, and 4 annas. Featuring a youthful profile of Queen Victoria aet. 15 years, all four values were designed and printed in Calcutta, and issued without perforations or gum. All were lithographed except for the 2 annas green, which was produced by typography from copper clichés or from electrotyped plates. The 4 annas value (illustrated) was one of the world's first bicolored stamps, preceded only by the Basel Dove, a beautiful local issue.

These stamps were issued following a Commission of Inquiry which had carefully studied the postal systems of Europe and America. In the opinion of Geoffrey Clarke, the reformed system was to be maintained "for the benefit of the people of India and not for the purpose of swelling the revenue." The Commissioners voted to abolish the earlier practice of conveying official letters free of postage ("franking"). The new system was recommended by the Governor-General, Lord Dalhousie, and adopted by the East India Company's Court of Directors. It introduced "low and uniform" rates for sending mail efficiently throughout the country within the jurisdiction of the East India Company. The basic rate was 1/2 anna on letters not more than 1/4 tola in weight. The stamps were needed to show the postage was prepaid, a basic principle of the new system, like the fundamental changes of the British system advocated by Rowland Hill and the Scinde reforms of Bartle Frere. These reforms transformed mail services within India.

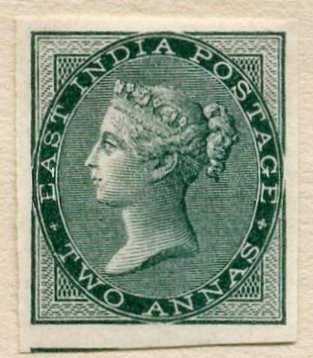
The De La Rue design for the Recess Printed issues: an 1856 color imprimatur, 2 annas "bottle green"

The East India Company already had attempted a 1/2 anna vermilion stamp in April 1854, known as the "9½ arches essay". This could not be produced in quantity because it required an expensive vermilion pigment not readily available from England, and the substituted Indian pigment destroyed the printing stones.

A new design for stamps, with Queen Victoria in an oval vignette inside a rectangular frame, was inscribed "EAST INDIA POSTAGE". These stamps were recess printed by De La Rue in England (who produced all the subsequent issues of British India until 1925). The first of these became available in 1855. They continued in use well after the British government took over the administration of India in 1858, following the 1857 Rebellion against the East India Company's rule. From 1865 the Indian stamps were printed on paper watermarked with an elephant's head.

=== 1866 reforms and the Provisionals ===
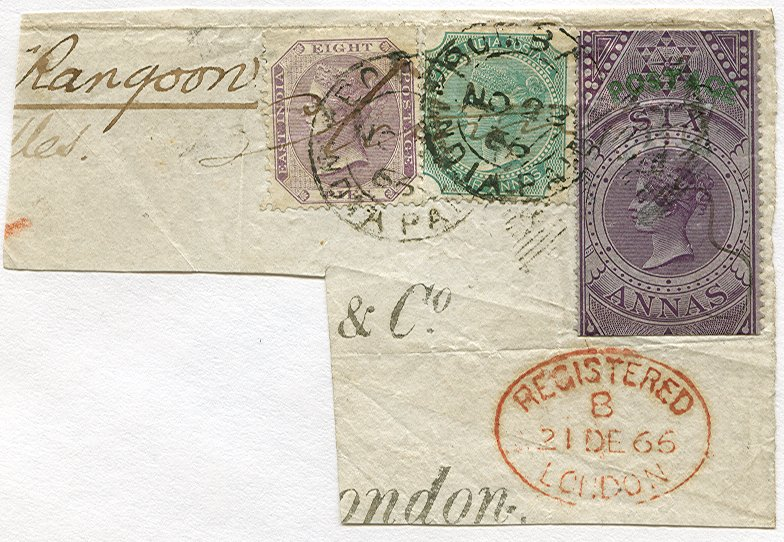
6 annas provisional, 1866, Bombay to London by steamer, 28 days

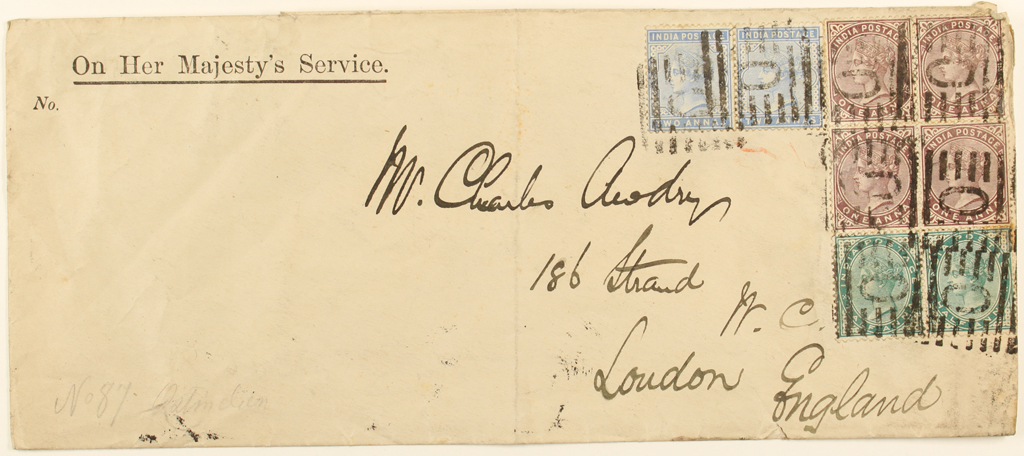
An official letter with Half, One and Two Anna stamps

The volume of mail moved by the postal system increased relentlessly, doubling between 1854 and 1866, then doubling again by 1871. The Post Office Act XIV introduced reforms by 1 May 1866 to correct some of the more apparent postal system deficiencies and abuses. Postal service efficiencies also were introduced. In 1863 new lower rates were set for "steamer" mail to Europe at 6 annas 8 pies for a 1/2 ounce letter. Lower rates were introduced for inland mail, as well.

New regulations removed the special postal privileges which had been enjoyed by officials of the East India Company. Stamps for official use were prepared and carefully accounted for to combat the abuse of privileges by officials. In 1854 Spain had printed special stamps for official communications, but in 1866 India was the first country to adopt the simple expedient of overprinting 'Service' on postage stamps and 'Service Postage' on revenue stamps. This innovation became widely adopted by other countries in later years.

Shortages developed, so these stamps also had to be improvised. Some of the "Service Postage" overprinted rarities of this year resulted from the sudden changes in postal regulations. New designs for the 4 annas and "6 annas 8 pies" stamps were issued in 1866. Nevertheless, there was a shortage of stamps to meet the new rates. Provisional six annas stamps were improvised by cutting the tops and bottoms from a current Foreign Bill revenue stamp, and overprinting "POSTAGE".

Another four new designs appeared, one at a time, between 1874 and 1876.

A complete new set of stamps was issued in 1882 for the Empire of India that had been proclaimed five years earlier, in 1877. The designs consisted of the usual Victoria profile, in a variety of frames, inscribed "INDIA POSTAGE". The watermark also changed to a star shape. These stamps were heavily used and are still quite common today.

Three stamps, featuring a detail from Heinrich von Angeli's 1885 portrait of Queen Victoria, in 2, 3 and 5 rupee denominations, were introduced in 1895. Other existing designs were reprinted in new colours in 1900.

== Postal history of Indian states ==
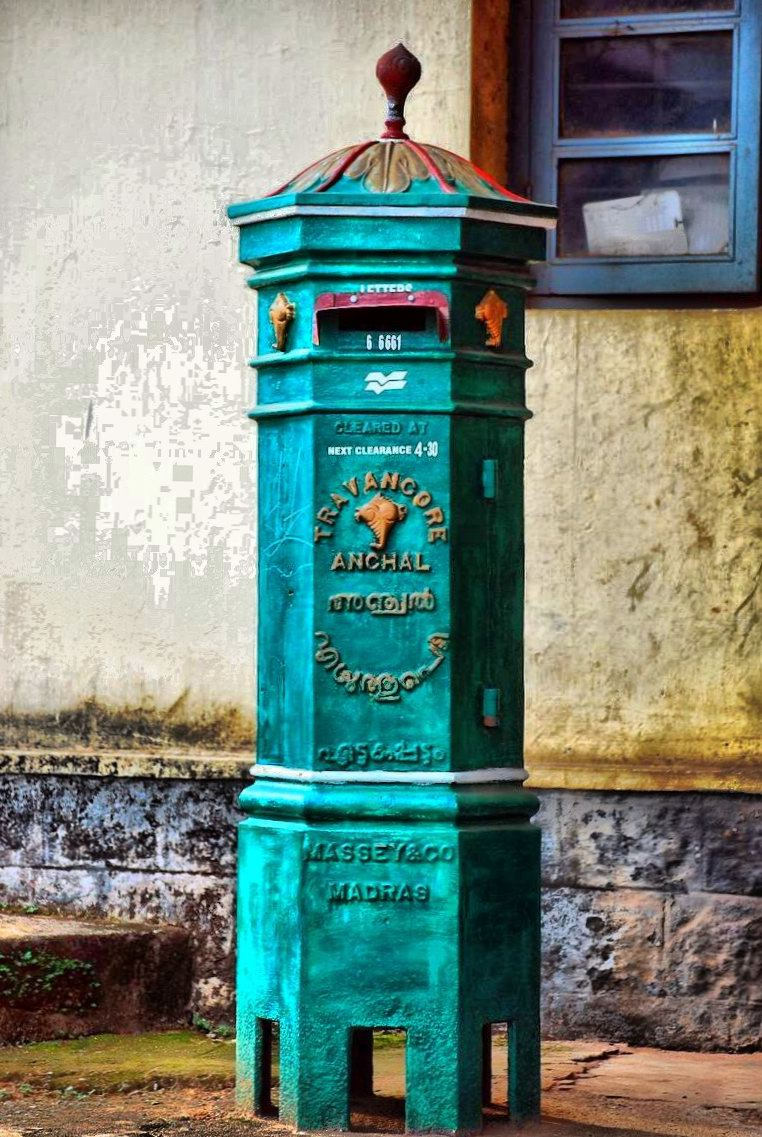
Anchal Petty (Post box) of Travancore

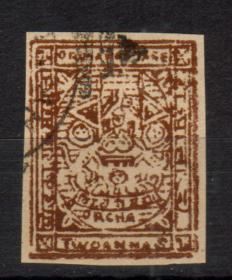
1916 red-brown 2 anna of Orchha, a feudatory state

British India had hundreds of Princely States, some 652 in all, but most of them did not issue postage stamps. The stamp-issuing States were of two kinds: the Convention States and the Feudatory States. The postage stamps and postal histories of these States provide great challenges and many rewards to the patient philatelist. Many rarities are to be found here. Although handbooks are available, much remains to be discovered.

The convention states are those which had postal conventions (or agreements) with the Post Office of India to provide postal services within their territories. The adhesive stamps and postal stationery of British India were overprinted for use within each convention state. The first convention state was Patiala, in 1884, followed by others (Chamba, Faridkot (formerly feudatory; convention from 1887), Gwalior, Jind (formerly feudatory; convention from 1885) and Nabha) between 1885 and 1887. The stamps of the convention states all became invalid on 1 January 1951 when they were replaced with stamps of the Republic of India valid from 1 January 1950.

The feudatory states maintained their own postal services within their territories and issued stamps with their own designs. Many of the stamps were imperforate and without gum, as issued. Many varieties of type, paper, inks and dies are not listed in the standard catalogues. The stamps of each feudatory state were valid only within that state, so letters sent outside that state needed additional British India postage. The feudatory states, with their start and end years, were:

- Alwar (1877–1899)
- Bamra (1888–1893)
- Barwani (1921–1938)
- Bhopal (1876–1932)
- Bhor (1879–1901)
- Bijawar (1935–1937)
- Bundi (1894–1941)
- Bussahir (1895–1900)
- Bahawalpur (1947–1949)
- Charkhari (1894–1943)
- Cochin (1892–1933)
- Dhar (1897–1898)
- Duttia (1893–1916)
- Faridkot (1879–1900)
- Hyderabad (1869–1949)
- Idar (1939–1944)
- Indore (1886–1941)
- Jaipur (1900–1947)
- Jammu and Kashmir (1878–1886)
- Jammu (1866–1877)
- Jind (1874–1885)
- Kashmir (1866–1867)
- Jasdan (1942–1942)
- Jhalawar (1887–1887)
- Kishangarh (1899–1928)
- Las Bela (1897–1904)
- Morvi (1931–1935)
- Nandgaon (1892–1893)
- Nowanuggur (1877–1893)
- Orchha (1913–1939)
- Poonch (1876–1884)
- Rajasthan (1949–1949)
- Rajpipla (1880)
- Sirmur (1879–1899)
- Soruth (1864–1937)
- Travancore (1888–1946)
- Travancore-Cochin (1949–1950)
- Wadhwan (1888–1889)

Both Faridkot and Jind, as feudatory states, issued their own stamps before they joined the Postal Convention. Faridkot joined on 1 January 1887. Jind joined in July 1885; its stamps from the feudatory period became invalid for postage, but they continued to be used for revenue purposes.

== Early 20th century ==
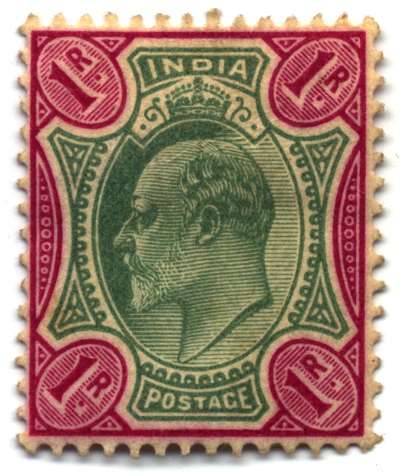
Edward VII one rupee stamp (1902)

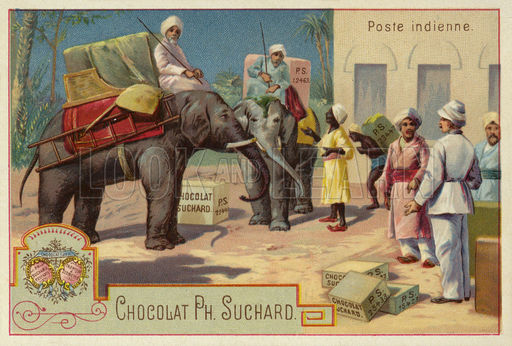
Indian postal service. Promotional card, Suchard Chocolates, late 19th or early 20th century

In 1902 a new series depicting King Edward VII generally reused the frames of the Victoria stamps, with some color changes, and included values up to 25 rupees. The higher values were often used for the payment of telegraph and parcel fees. Generally, such usage will lower a collector's estimation of a stamp's value; except those from remote or "used abroad" offices.

The 1911 stamps of King George V were more florid in their design. It is reported that George V, a philatelist, personally approved these designs. In 1919 a 1½ anna stamp was introduced, inscribed "ONE AND HALF ANNA", but in 1921 this changed to "ONE AND A HALF ANNAS". In 1926 the watermark changed to a pattern of multiple stars.

The first pictorial stamps appeared in 1931. The set of six, showing the fortress of Purana Qila, Delhi and government edifices, was issued to mark the government's move from Calcutta to New Delhi. Another pictorial set of seven stamps, also showing buildings, commemorated George V's Silver Jubilee in 1935.

The stamps issued in 1937 depicted various forms of mail transports, with King George VI's effigy appearing on the higher values. A new issue in 1941, constrained by the austerity of World War II, consisted of rather plain designs using minimal amounts of ink and paper. As Indian Post Offices annually required some billions of stamps for postage, as a measure of economy the large pictorial stamps were immediately withdrawn and smaller stamps were issued. Even this did not ease the paper situation and it was thought desirable to reduce the size even more.

A victory issue in January 1946 was followed in November 1947 by a first Dominion issue, whose three stamps were the first to depict the Ashoka Pillar and the new flag of India (the third showed an aeroplane).

Postage stamps were generally issued separately from the revenue stamps. However, in 1906, the set of King Edward VII stamps were issued in two values, half anna and one anna with the caption "INDIA POSTAGE & REVENUE". The George V Series (1911 to 1933) added two more values, two annas and four annas to the Postage & Revenue stamps. These dual-purpose issues were an exception and generally the two types were issued separately.

=== India Security Press ===
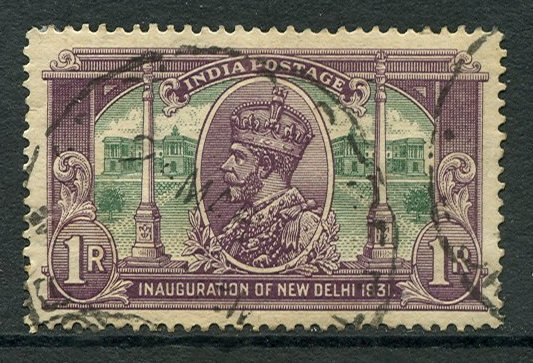
The 1931 series celebrated the inauguration of New Delhi as the seat of government. The one rupee stamp shows the Secretariat and Dominion Columns.

From 1 January 1926 all printing and overprinting of India' postage stamps was conducted at India Security Press, Nasik. The possibility of printing postage stamps and other security items in India had been enquired into before the First World War but could not be pursued at that time. In 1922, the feasibility of this issue was explored in England by Lt Col C.H. Willis, C.I.E., then master of the Bombay Mint, and Mr F.D. Ascoti, I.C.S., Controller of Printing, Stationery and Stamps. Their favourable report, followed by a successful demonstration of production techniques in Delhi in 1923, led to the decision of the Government to establish a security press at Nashik. The responsibility of setting up the Press was entrusted to none other than the London firm of Thomas De La Rue which already had a six-decade long association with Indian stamps. The construction began in 1924 at an original estimate of Rs 27½ lakhs and was completed in 1925 with additional costs of Rs 67 and 1/400,000.

The printing of stamps at Nasik began in 1925. The first stamps produced were the definitive series of George V, printed using typography from the same plates used earlier in England by De La Rue, which were now transferred to India. The watermark was changed by the Press to multiple stars. Lithography was now re-introduced and the first stamps printed with this technique were the first Air Mail series of 1929. The Security Press continued to use typography for most stamps, reserving the lithographic process for the most important commemorative issues, the next being the 1931 series commemorating the inauguration of New Delhi as the seat of government in 1931. The one rupee stamp shows the Secretariat and Dominion Columns. This practice continued after independence. The first definitive series to be issued was the misnamed "Archaeological" series of 16 values; the top four values were produced by lithography and the remaining values by typography.

The new technique of photogravure printing was installed in 1952. The October 1952 series of six values on the theme of Saints and Poets was the first to be so produced. However, these were not the first photogravure stamps of India, having been preceded by the first Gandhi series of 1948, which were printed by Courvoisier of Geneva using the photogravure technique. Since then, photogravure has been used to produce all Indian stamps; typography and lithography being reserved for service labels only.

== Independent India ==
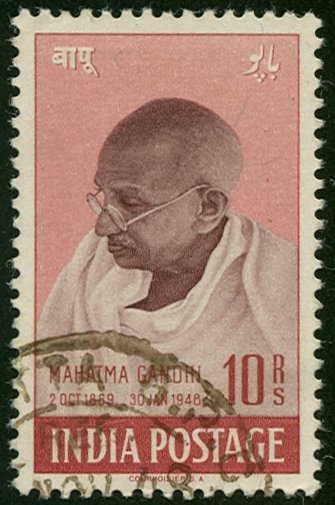
The Rs 10 stamp showing Mahatma Gandhi, released 15 August 1948

The First Stamp of Independent India was issued on 21 November 1947. It depicts the Indian Flag with the patriots' slogan, Jai Hind (Long Live India), on the top right hand corner. It was valued at three and one-half annas.

A memorial to Mahatma Gandhi was issued 15 August 1948 on the first anniversary of Independence. Exactly one year later a definitive series appeared, depicting India's broad cultural heritage, mostly Hindu, Buddhist, Muslim, Sikh and Jain temples, sculptures, monuments and fortresses. A subsequent issue commemorated the inauguration of the Republic of India on 26 January 1950.

Definitives included a technology and development theme in 1955, a series all showing the map of India in 1957, denominated in naye paisa (decimal currency), and a series with a broad variety of images in 1965.

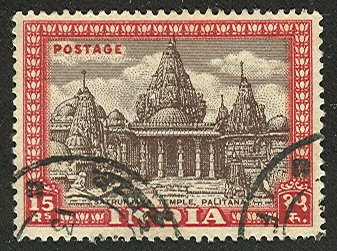
Satrunjaya, Jain temple complex near Palitana, 15 August 1949. Indian stamps reflect the country's old and rich cultural heritage.

The old inscription of "INDIA POSTAGE" was replaced in 1962 with "भारत INDIA", though three stamps issued between December 1962/January 1963 carried the earlier inscription.

India has printed stamps and postal stationery for other countries, mostly neighbours. Countries which have had stamps printed in India include Burma (before independence), Nepal, Bangladesh, Bhutan, Portugal, and Ethiopia.

== Today ==
The Department of Posts, operating as India Post, is a government-operated postal system, simply referred to within India as "the post office". With its far-flung reach and its presence in remote areas, the Indian postal service provides many services such as small savings banking and financial services. As of 31 March 2011, the Indian Postal Service has 154,866 post offices, of which 139,040 (89.78%) are in rural areas and 15,826 (10.22%) are in urban areas. It has 25,464 departmental POs and 129,402 ED BPOs. At the time of independence, there were 23,344 post offices, which were primarily in urban areas. Thus, the network has registered a sevenfold growth since Independence, with the expansion primarily in rural areas. On an average, a post office serves an area of 21.23 sq;km and a population of 7,114 people. India is believed to have the most widely distributed system in the world (China has 57,000, Russia 41,000 and the United States 38,000 offices). This proliferation of offices results from India's history of having many disparate postal systems, eventually unified in the Indian Union after Independence.

India has been divided into 22 postal circles, each circle headed by a Chief Postmaster General. Each Circle is further divided into Regions comprising field units, called Divisions, headed by a Postmaster General, and further divided into units headed by SSPOs & SPOs and Sub Divisions headed by ASPs and IPS. Other functional units like Circle Stamp Depots, Postal Stores Depots and Mail Motor Service exist in various Circles and Regions. Besides the 22 circles, there is a special Base Circle to provide the postal services for the Armed Forces of India. The Base Circle is headed by an Additional Director General, Army Postal Service holding the rank of a Major General.

Gandhi, Nehru and other historic personalities continued to appear on the postal issues coming from the country since Independence, with almost half a century seeing the Gandhi definitives of denominations most frequently used in the era concerned, becoming synonymous with a postage stamp to the Indian people of that respective time period. New themes are now finding their place on Indian postage stamps, with some stamps issued jointly with postal agencies of other countries, renewable energy sources, the local flora and fauna and even the special annual issues wishing season's greetings. On 9 March 2011 India Post launched an online e-post office. The portal provides electronic money orders, instant money orders, stamps for collectors, postal information, tracking of express and international shipments, PIN code search and registration of feedback and complaints online.

=== National Philatelic Museum ===
But I hit upon a much simpler plan. I gathered together all the children in my locality and asked them to volunteer two or three hours' labour of a morning when they had no school. This they willingly agreed to do. I promised to bless them and give them, as a reward, used postage stamps which I had collected.

— Mahatma Gandhi, Rajkot 1896.

The National Philatelic Museum of India was inaugurated on 6 July 1968 in New Delhi. It had its beginning at a meeting of the Philatelic Advisory Committee on 18 September 1962. Besides the large collection of India Postage stamps designed, printed and issued, it has a large collection of Indian states, both confederate and feudatory, early essays, proofs and colour trials, a collection of Indian stamps "used abroad" and as well as early Indian postcards, postal stationery and thematic collections.

The museum was extensively renovated in 2009. It now includes more exhibits, a philatelic bureau and other postal objects such as beautiful Victorian post boxes.

An international philatelic exhibition was held from 12 to 18 February 2011, on the centenary of India's first official air mail. For the occasion of INDIPEX 2011 India Post brought out a special stamp on Mahatma Gandhi to commemorate the event. It is printed on khadi, the handspun cotton material that Gandhi held out as the symbol of self-determination and self-reliance. The Presentation Pack was released by Pratibha Patil, the President of India on Saturday 12 February 2011 at INDIPEX 2011, the World Philatelic Exhibition held in New Delhi, the capital of India.

== See also ==
- Communications in India
- List of postage stamps of India
- Inverted Head 4 Annas
- Philatelic Society of India
- Postage stamps depicting Mahatma Gandhi
- Revenue stamps of India

== References and sources ==
Sources

- Crofton, C.S.F. and Wilmot Corfield (1905) The Adhesive Fiscal and Telegraph Stamps of British India. Calcutta: Thacker, Spink & Co.
- Crofton, C.S.F., L.L.R. Hausburg and C. Stewart-Wilson. (1907) The Postage and Telegraph Stamps of British India. London: Stanley Gibbons for the Philatelic Society of India.
- Datta, Jayanta; Datta, Anjali; Datta, Jayoti & Datta, Ananya. (2008). Rare stamps of the world. Army Philatelic Society, Mumbai.
- Dawson, L. E. (1948) The One Anna and Two Annas Postage Stamps of India, 1854–55. Philatelic Society of India, H. Garratt-Adams & Co. and Stanley Gibbons, Ltd., London
- Haverbeck, H.D.S. (1985). "The Sind District Dawk," The Collectors Club Philatelist v. 44 no. 2 (March 1965) pp. 79–85.
- Lowe, Robson. (1951) Encyclopedia of British Empire Postage Stamps v.III, pp. 131–6. "The Sind District Dawk," pp. 149–152.
- Smythies, E. A. and Martin, D. R.. (1930). The Four Annas Lithographed Stamps of India, 1854–55. Philatelic Society of India and Stanley Gibbons Ltd., London.
- Smythies, E. A., and Martin, Denys R. (1928). The Half Anna Lithographed Stamps of India. Published for the Philatelic Society of India, Lahore, 1928.
- Mazumdar, Mohini Lal (1995) Early History and Growth of Postal System in India. Calcutta, RDDHI-India. ISBN 81-85292-07-8 [The postal history through 1858]
- Mazumdar, Mohini Lal (1990) The Imperial Post Offices of British India. Calcutta, Phila Publications.
- Saksena, Vishnu S. (1989) Notes for the Indian Stamp Collector. Army Postal Service Historic & Philatelic Society. Pratibha Printing Press, New Delhi.
- Rossiter, Stuart and John Flower. (1986) The Stamp Atlas. London: Macdonald. ISBN 0-356-10862-7
- Stanley Gibbons Ltd: various catalogues.
- Stewart-Wilson, Sir Charles. (1904). British Indian Adhesive Stamps (Queen's Head) Surcharged for Native States, rev. ed. with B.G. Jones.
