= Inverted Head 4 Annas =

Indian postage stamp

Inverted Head Four Annas
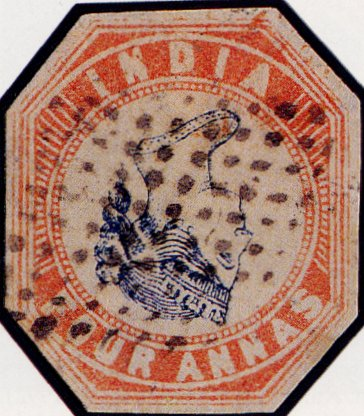
- Country of production: India
- Location of production: Survey Office, Calcutta
- Date of production: 1854
- Depicts: Queen Victoria
- Nature of rarity: Invert error
- No. in existence: 28
- Face value: Four Annas

The Inverted Head Four Annas of India is a postage stamp prized by collectors. The 1854 first issues of India included a Four Annas value in red and blue. It was one of the world's first multicolored stamps; the Basel Dove preceded it by nine years. However, an invert error occurred during production, showing the head "upside down."

== Four annas stamps ==
The Four Annas stamps were lithographed by the Survey Office in Calcutta. Two colors were used, red for the frame and blue for the head. During production, the paper was first imprinted with the red frames, and then the sheets were laid out to dry overnight. The next day, the blue heads were added within the frames. The First Printing, using Head Die I and Frame Die I, both as shown here, began on October 13, 1854. There were 12 widely spaced stamps in each sheet. Exactly 206,040 stamps were printed for this Head Die I issue.

== Inverted head four annas ==
Among these First Printing stamps, at least six sheets with the red frames had been inadvertently turned 180 degrees before being placed in the press. So, although the heads appear to be upside down, it was the red frames that were inverted. D.N. Jatia found that at least six sheets must have been fed into the press upside-down, as six of these stamps from Position 4 showed different lithographic stones were used for the head and frame dies.

The surviving examples of this error are low in number. E. A. Smythies states that, at one time, "Details and illustrations of all the known copies [were] given in that interesting publication, Stamps of Fame, by L. N. and M. Williams." One additional example has been reported, yielding 28 total known examples. All of these are postally used. Only two (or three) are known cut square; another 25 are cut to shape (that is, in an octagonal shape). One from the collection of the Earl of Crawford was exhibited in the World Philatelic Exhibition in Washington in 2006.

== Discovery of the error ==
This error appears not to have been discovered until many years after the stamps were issued. None of the 1870s publications mentions the Inverted Head Four Annas. The 1891 reprints provide the first conclusive evidence that the error was known, but E. A. Smythies said the error was first noticed during a meeting of the Philatelic Society of London in 1874. In 1907 L.L.R. Hausburg mentioned the Inverted Head Four Annas, but incorrectly, as he was not sure whether it came from the First or Second Printings. Mr. Séfi described this error in the West End Philatelist, January 1912.

== Collections ==
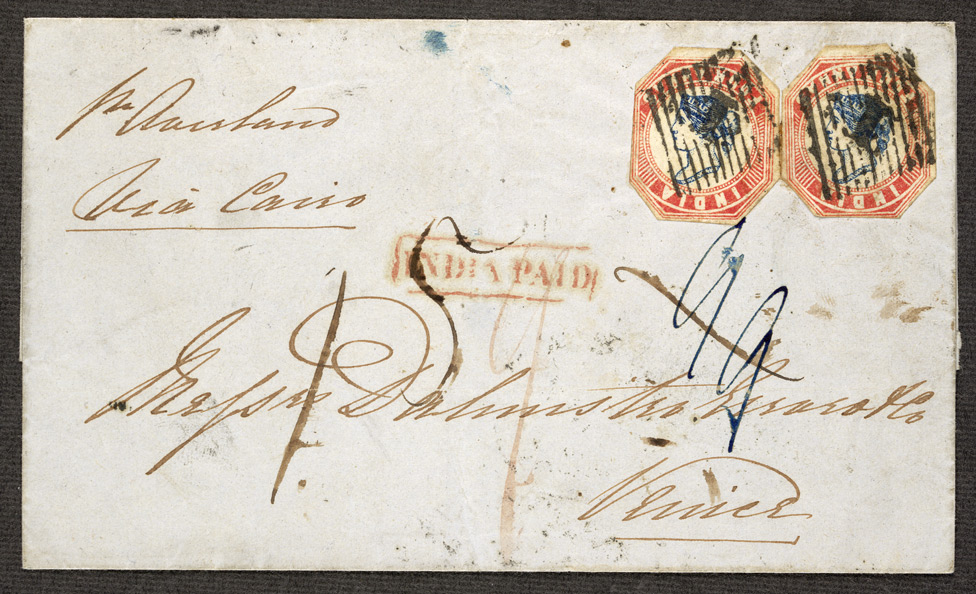
The two cut-to-shape Inverted Head 4 Annas, on the cover. The Tapling Collection.

Three cut to shape examples of the Inverted Head Four Annas are in the Tapling Collection at the British Library, London, including two (positions 3 and 4 on the printed sheet) on cover, indicating that the error was created by an incorrect sheet placement rather than by a careless die transfer. One example, carefully cut to shape, from position five on the sheet, is found in the Royal Collection. The Government of India Collection, in Delhi, has a cut to shape example on the piece, position two on the sheet. Two examples cut square, one of them on the cover, was in the collection of C. D. Desai. Desai "raised" his stamp from its cover for study. The provenance of several other examples is described in Martin and Smythies, as cited below.

== Forgeries ==
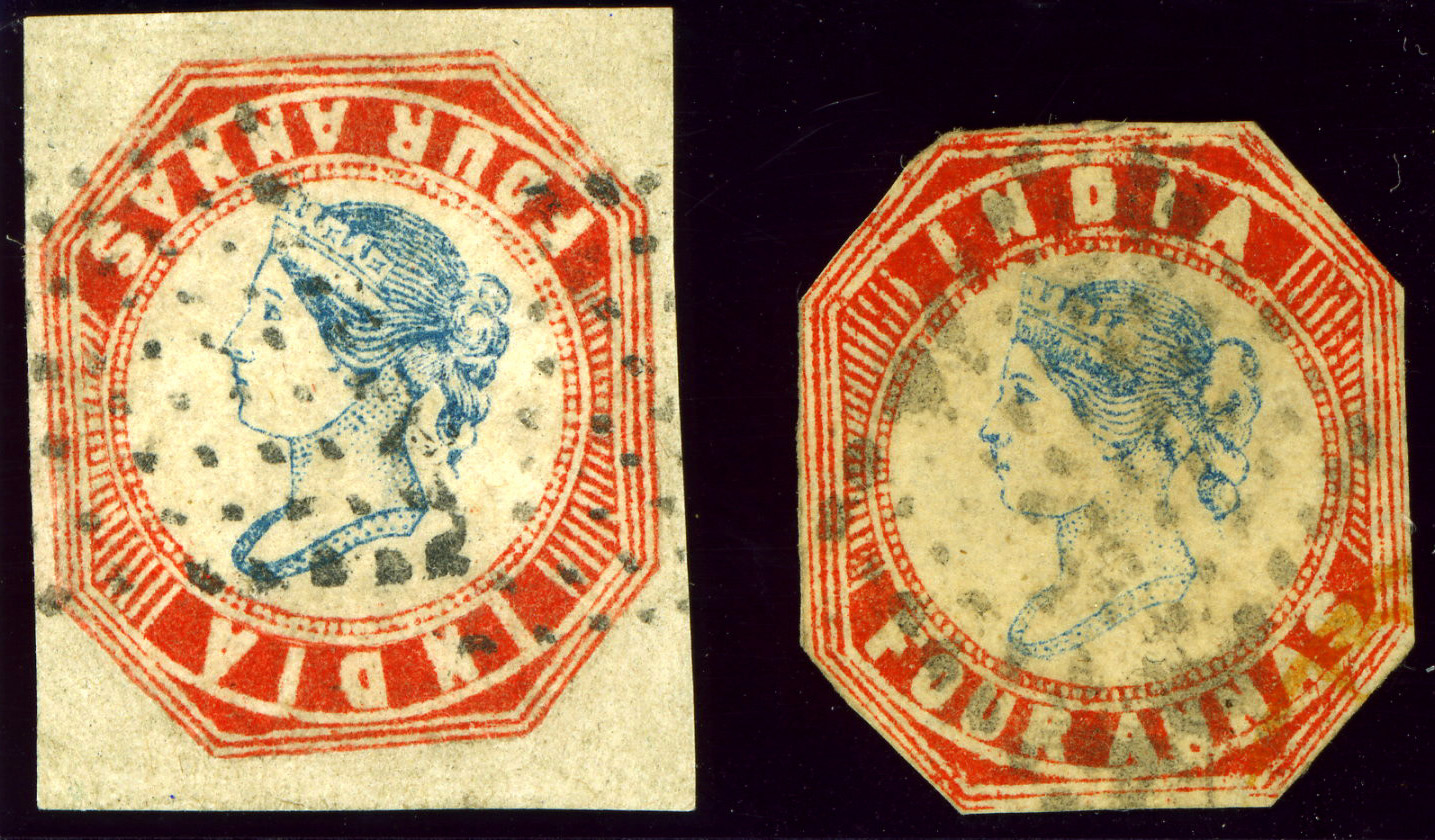
A forgery of the Inverted Head (left), next to an ordinary stamp (right). The head and frame of the inverted stamp are not from the First Printing, so this cannot be a genuine inverted head stamp.

Forgeries have been made by chemically erasing the upright head or the frame and then printing over it. These can be detected using "black light" (long wave (UV-A) ultraviolet light) and other techniques. One of these fakes appeared in the Masson sale and one or two in the Ferrary auctions. Some clever forgeries purport to show an inverted head with incorrect head dies, which are obvious. Crude forgeries are plentiful.

== See also ==
- List of notable postage stamps
- Postage stamps and postal history of India

== References and sources ==
Sources

- D. R. Martin and E. A. Smythies, The Four Annas Lithographed Stamps of India, 1854-55 London, Philatelic Society of India and Stanley Gibbons Ltd. (1930), pages 36–8.
- Robson Lowe, Encyclopedia of British Empire Postage Stamps, vol. III, p. 171.
- E. D. Bacon, The Essays, Proofs, and Reprints of the first issued Postage Stamps of British India of 1854-55. Third edition, 1927 (with the supplement in P.J.I, 1933), page 19.
- Leslie L. R. Hausburg, The Postage and Telegraph Stamps of British India ... Part I. Postage Stamps. London: Stanley Gibbons, 1907.
- The Monthly Journal, v. X, p. 167.
- Bertram W. H. Poole, West End Philatelist, June 1910, page 10.
- Alexander J. Séfi, West End Philatelist, January 1912.
