= Smythies =

Smythies is a surname. Notable people with the surname include:

- Bertram Smythies (1912–1999), British forester and ornithologist
- Charles Smythies (1844–1894), British colonial bishop
- Evelyn Arthur Smythies (1885–1975), British-Indian forester and philatelist
- Harriette Smythies (1813-1883), English novelist and poet
- John Raymond Smythies (1922–2019), British neuropsychiatrist, neuroscientist and neurophilosopher
- Yorick Smythies (1917–1980), librarian and pupil of philosopher Ludwig Wittgenstein

See also

- Jill Smythies Award for botanical artists
