= W. C. Renouf =

British philatelist (1868–1954)

- Born: 5 March 1868; St Helier, Jersey
- Died: 28 June 1954 (aged 86); Jersey
- Education: Christ Church, University of Oxford
- Occupation: Civil servant in India
- Employer: Indian Civil Service (1889–1922)
- Known for: Study of the philately of India

Winter Charles Renouf CIE (5 March 1868 – 28 June 1954) was a British member of the Indian Civil Service who specialised in agriculture. He was also a justice of the peace in India, official member of the Central Legislative Assembly, and political agent at Bahawalpur. In 1921, he was president of the Cantonment Reforms Committee set up by the Government of India. He retired in 1922.

Renouf was a noted philatelist who was one of the first to take an interest in early Indian postal markings and British Indian stamps used abroad. He edited The Philatelic Journal of India and was Hon. Vice-President of the Philatelic Society of India. In 1921, he signed the Roll of Distinguished Philatelists. His philatelic work was continued by Jal Cooper and his classification system of Indian postal markings continues to be referred to as "Renouf types".

== Early life and family ==
Winter Renouf was born on 5 March 1868 in St Helier, Jersey, in the Channel Islands. His father, Francis G. Renouf, was a mathematician and a master mariner, and his mother was Elizabeth J. Renouf (née Vardon). He was educated at Victoria College, Jersey, before attending Wren and Gurney's preparatory school in London from where he won a scholarship to Christ Church, University of Oxford. He passed the examination of the Indian Civil Service in 1887 in second place.

Renouf married Ellie Marion (née Sheeu) on 14 November 1893, at Rawalpindi. Their best man was Mr O'Dwyer. Ellie died in 1941.

== Career ==
Renouf reached India in 1889 where he joined the Bengal Civil Service. He served in the Punjab as assistant commissioner at Murree. In 1892 he was appointed Justice of the Peace and in 1899 he was appointed deputy commissioner. In 1901, he became director of land records and agriculture. In 1910, he published a bulletin on the advantages of growing "hard" Canadian red wheats there over the "soft" white wheats that predominated, the latter having been introduced following a report by McDougall Brothers in their favour in 1882. He was an official member of the Central Legislative Assembly and political agent at Bahawalpur. In 1921, he was president of the Cantonment Reforms Committee set up by the Government of India before retiring the following year.

== Philately ==
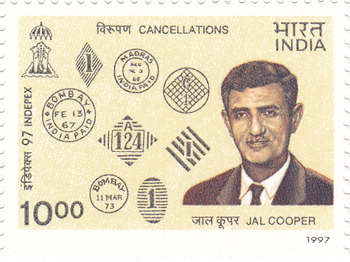
Jal Cooper on a 1997 stamp of India with early Indian postal markings, an area of study pioneered by Renouf and continued by Cooper.

Renouf was a noted philatelist who was one of the first to take an interest in early Indian postal markings and British Indian stamps used abroad, publishing monographs on those subjects in 1919 and 1920 respectively. He edited The Philatelic Journal of India and was Hon. Vice-President of the Philatelic Society of India. He signed the Roll of Distinguished Philatelists in 1921. He joined the Royal Philatelic Society London in 1923 where he was proposed by Edward Denny Bacon and Herbert R. Oldfield. His work on early Indian cancellations was expanded and re-written as an appendix to volume three (Asia) of Robson Lowe's The Encyclopaedia of British Empire Postage Stamps 1775-1950.

In an obituary in 1954, Jal Cooper, whose philatelic interests coincided with Renouf's and who continued his work, described Renouf as one of the "stalwarts" of early Indian philately. His Indian collection was auctioned by Robson Lowe in 1960.

== Death and legacy ==
Renouf died at his home in Jersey on 28 June 1954 after a "very painful and long illness" during the last two years of which he became blind, causing him to be unable to follow his hobby of philately which he regarded as a great loss. He received an obituary from Jal Cooper in the newsletter of the India Study Circle. He is buried with his wife at St Clement, Jersey. His classification of Indian postmarks is still referred to in the pages of the India Study Circle's India Post as "Renouf types".

== Publications ==
=== Articles ===
- "The Cultivation of 'Stronger' and More Valuable Wheats for Export from the Punjab", Bulletin, No. 1 (1910), Department of Agriculture, Punjab.
- "Early Indian Cancellations, 1855-1884". Appendix I (pp. 485–549) in Robson Lowe (Ed.) The Encyclopaedia of British Empire Postage Stamps 1775-1950. Volume III The Empire in Asia. Robson Lowe Ltd., London, 1951.

=== Books ===
- Early Indian Cancellations and Postmarks 1852-84. Philatelic Society of India, Lahore, 1919. (Supplement, 1923)
- British-Indian Stamps Used Abroad. Philatelic Society of India, Lahore, 1920. (Supplement, 1923)

== See also ==
- Green Revolution in India
