= Choonilal Devkaran Nanjee =

Indian businessman and philatelist (1890–1948)

- C.D. Desai
- Born: Darvinder Babagur; 1890; India
- Died: 1948 (aged 57–58); Bombay, India
- Occupations: Commodity trader, Financier, Philatelist
- Organization: Devkaran Nanjee Banking Co. Ltd. (Dena Bank)
- Children: Lalitchandra C. D. Nanjee (son)

Choonilal Devkaran Nanjee (1890–1948), also known as C. D. Desai, was a 20th-century Indian commodity trader, financier and philatelist.

== Financial career ==
Desai was a senior partner in the firm of Messrs. Devkaran Nanjee and Sons, stock, cotton, bullion and exchange brokers. He was also the honorary Treasurer of the Bombay Stock Exchange and one of the founding directors of Devkaran Nanjee Banking Co. Ltd. (later renamed the Dena Bank), on 26 May 1938, and other allied companies with his brother Pranlal Devkaran Nanjee.

== Philatelic career ==
He made many discoveries among the 1854 lithographed stamps of India and formed a collection of these classic issues with the assistance of Jal Cooper. Desai's collection included many items of extreme rarity. It featured the unused block of 14 of the white Scinde Dawk stamp. His collection included the finest known example of the 1854 Head Inverted Four Annas stamp, cut square and on cover, as well as a second cut square example of this rarity.

As Jal Cooper noted, "The late Mr. Desai had few equals in the realm of Indian philately. .... His helping hand was a constant source of solace to many Indian dealers and there was a regular pilgrimage to his home from dealers in other parts of India."

Collaborating with Sir Eric Studd, he discovered the 1854 One Anna Red Die I "Substituted Transfer". He also found the typographed Two Annas yellowish grey-green of 1854 on a previously unknown paper watermarked One Anna. In 2010, Markand Dave FRPSL published a detailed paper on the subject of "1854 Two Annas on ONE ANA Watermark" in The London Philatelist (the journal of the Royal Philatelic Society London) with one N in ANA, where Mr. Desai had reported two N's in ANNA.

The Desai collection was offered for sale to the public in 917 lots by Messrs Robson Lowe, philatelic auctioneers, on 25 and 26 May 1949. The auction included his collection of "Scinde Dawk" stamps and the 1854 issues of India.

He was a Fellow of the Royal Philatelic Society London.

== Death ==
Desai died in Bombay in 1948. He was survived by his son, Lalitchandra C. D. Nanjee, who later became Chairman of Dena Bank, Devkaran Nanjee Insurance Co. and Devkaran Nanjee Investment Co.
