= Gerald Davis (philatelist) =

British architect, graphic designer, historian and philatelist (1916–2005)

Gerald Davis (10 October 1916 – 16 June 2005) was an architect, graphic designer, postal historian and philatelist. His 1971 Burma Postal History is a classic study, both readable and comprehensive.

== Life ==
Davis learned the basics of stamps and philately while helping out with his father's stamp shop in Baker Street, Marylebone, Westminster. As an adult he formed an extraordinary collection of the postal history of Burma, including the Japanese post offices in Burma and the overland routes to China and Thailand.

== Burma ==
After Dunkirk Davis went to India with the British Fourteenth Army, a multinational force comprising units from Commonwealth countries during World War II. After the Battle of Imphal he served in Burma, present-day Myanmar, where he took part in the Chindwin River valley campaign and the surrender of Rangoon in May, 1945.

In 1990, Robson Lowe commented, "Besides acquiring much of his modern collection from villagers who preferred cigarettes to British currency, his negotiations after the formal enemy capitulation in August, with Burmese postal officials, for stamps which have since become collectible, by his own account comprised his most active service."

Using the first-hand knowledge of the country gained from his military assignments, and building on foundations laid by W. Renouf, Jal Cooper and Vernon Rowe, Gerald Davis' studies and presentations of Burma's postal history brought the country to its present-day attraction for collectors and philatelists. Davis was a fellow and member of the Society of Postal Historians, the India Study Circle and Kingston Philatelic Society.

== Awards ==
- Fellow of the Royal Philatelic Society London (FRPSL), elected 1972.
- Tilleard Medal for excellence in exhibit presentation, 1975.
- Rowland Hill Award for Journalistic Excellence for 2001.

== Publications ==
- Gerald Davis and Denys Martin, Burma Postal History, including the 1987 Supplement. Robson Lowe, Ltd., Woods of Perth, Scotland. (1971)
