= H. D. S. Haverbeck =

Philatelist and philatelic journalist (1913–1986)

Harrison Donald Seaman Haverbeck or H.D.S. Haverbeck, FRPSL, RDP (October 9, 1913 – September 26, 1986 New York), was a noted philatelist and philatelic journalist, whose interests centered on India and Indian states, Tibet and Nepal.

From 1948 to 1986 he served on the editorial board of the New York publication, Collectors Club Philatelist, and succeeded Henry Goodkind as editor in 1970. He wrote extensively in the journal, and served the Collectors Club of New York in many other offices. It awarded him its Lichtenstein medal in 1966.

Haverbeck served on the Expert Committee of the Philatelic Foundation.

Haverbeck wrote valuable handbooks for the guidance of collectors and specialists. A definitive article on the Scinde Dawk appeared in 1965. Later, a series of Haverbeck's brief articles about the postage stamps and postal history of the various feudatory states of India appeared in Collectors Club Philatelist.

Haverbeck received the Alfred F. Lichtenstein Memorial Award for Distinguished Service to Philately from Collectors Club of New York in 1966 and signed the Roll of Distinguished Philatelists in 1970. He was inducted into the American Philatelic Society's Hall of Fame in 1987.

== Works ==
- The Postage Stamps and Postal History of Tibet, New York, Collectors Club (1952)
- The Postage Stamps of Nepal. New York: The Collectors Club, 1952. (With E.A. Smythies and L.E. Dawson)
- The Commemorative Stamps of the British Commonwealth, London, Faber and Faber (1955)
- "The Handstamped Overprints of Pakistan" (1963)
- "The Sind District Dawk", The Collectors Club Philatelist, v. 44 no. 2 (March, 1965) pp. 79–85.
- "The Stamps of the Native States of India". The Collectors Club Philatelist, v. 54 no. 1, pp. 23–4.

== Literature ==
- The Harrison D. S. Haverbeck Gold Medal Collection of Indian Native States, New York, H. R. Harmer (1973) Sales 2145 to 2149.
