= Dena Bank =

Bank in India (1938–2019)

- Formerly: Devkaran Nanjee Banking Company Ltd
- Type: Public
- Traded as: BSE: 532121; NSE: DENABANK
- ISIN: INE077A01010
- Industry: Banking financial services
- Founded: 26 May 1938; 88 years ago
- Founder: Devkaran Nanjee
- Defunct: 1 April 2019; 7 years ago
- Fate: Merged with Bank of Baroda
- Successor: Bank of Baroda
- Headquarters: (erstwhile) C-10, G Block, Bandra-Kurla Complex, Bandra (E), Mumbai, Maharashtra, India
- Number of locations: 1,872 branches (2018)
- Area served: India
- Services: Consumer banking; Corporate banking; Finance and insurance; Investment banking; Mortgage loans; Private banking; Private equity; Savings; Securities; Asset management; Wealth management
- Revenue: ▼₹8,932.23 crore (US$930 million) (2018)
- Operating income: ▼₹1,171.16 crore (US$120 million) (2018)
- Net income: ▼₹−1,923.15 crore (US$−200 million) (2018)
- Total assets: ▼₹120,859.79 crore (US$13 billion) (2018)
- Number of employees: 13,613 (2018)
- Capital ratio: 11.09% (2018)

Dena Bank was a government-owned bank that in 2019 merged with Bank of Baroda. It was headquartered in Mumbai and had 1,874 branches. The bank was founded in 1938 as a privately owned Bank. In 1969 the Government of India nationalized Dena Bank.

== History ==
Dena Bank was founded on 26 May 1938 by the sons of Devkaran Nanjee - Choonilal Devkaran Nanjee, Pranlal Devkaran Nanjee & other family members under the name Devkaran Nanjee Banking Company. It adopted its new name, Dena (Devkaran Nanjee) Bank, when it was incorporated as a public company in December 1939.

In July 1969, the government of India nationalized Dena Bank, along with thirteen other major banks. Dena Bank thereby became a Public Sector bank constituted under the Banking Companies (Acquisition & Transfer of Undertakings) Act, 1970.

=== Amalgamation ===
On 17 September 2018, the Finance Ministry of the government of India proposed to merge three state run banks — Vijaya Bank, Bank of Baroda, and Dena Bank — into a single bank. The amalgamated bank was estimated to become the third biggest bank in India with a total business of more than ₹1,482,000,000,000 (equivalent to ₹2.0 trillion or US$21 billion in 2023). Some of the main stated reasons for the merger were to help the weaker banks improve their operational efficiency, increase their customer base and market reach, and to help them raise capital without depending on government funds at all. Earlier that year, Dena Bank had been brought under the Prompt Corrective Action (PCA) framework due to its high non-performing loans. At the time of the proposal to merge, the gross NPA ratios of Bank of Baroda, Vijaya Bank and Dena Bank were 12.4%, 6.9% and 22% respectively, and Dena Bank was the weakest among the three in terms of its total business size.

The Union Cabinet and the boards of the banks approved the merger on 2 January 2019. Under the terms of the amalgamation, Dena Bank and Vijaya Bank shareholders received 110 and 402 equity shares of the Bank of Baroda, respectively, of face value ₹2 for every 1,000 shares they held. The amalgamation became effective from 1 April 2019.

Bank of Baroda announced that it would auction the Dena Corporate Centre (Dena Bank's head office) at Bandra Kurla Complex, Mumbai in September 2019.

== See also ==
- Banking in India
- List of banks in India
