= Pranlal Devkaran Nanjee =

Indian banker, businessman and philanthropist

Pranlal Devkaran Nanjee (11 June 1894 – 27 July 1956) was a noted Indian banker, businessman and philanthropist from Bombay, India.

== Birth & family life ==
He was born on 11 June 1894 at Porbandar, the second son of Seth Devkaran Nanjee.

He was married to Jayavati in 1911. She too was an active participant in the family's business. She was Fellow of the Indian Institute of Bankers and a member of Its Council; Trustee of the Indian Merchants' Chamber she was the only daughter of the late Govindji Jhaverchand, a Munsiff and Magistrate of Jamnagar State. She too was made Justice of Peace and Honorary Presidency Magistrate for Bombay.

== Career ==
Pranlal Devkarn Nanjee was a founder of Devkaran Nanjee Banking Company (later renamed Dena Bank), Devkaran Nanjee Insurance Company and Devkaran Nanjee Investment Company based at Bombay. He was inspired by his late father Shri Devkaran Nanjee's dream to start a bank. His elder brother, Choonilal Devkaran Nanjee and other family members, too, were partners in the firm. Dena Bank was founded on 26 May 1938 by the family of Devkaran Nanjee under the name Devkaran Nanjee Banking Company. It adopted its new name, Dena Bank (Devkaran Nanjee), when it incorporated as a public company in December 1939.

The Indian Banks' Association was founded by his vision and leadership in 1946. The idea was mooted by him way back in 1944, when as a President of Indian Merchants' Chamber, he argued that an association of Indian owned banks was needed and accordingly the meeting of some prominent Indian banks was held. With other leaders, like Sir Homi Mody, Pranlal Devkaran Nanjee played a crucial role in the formation of the Indian Banks' Association, which came into existence on 26 September 1946.

He served as the President of the Indian Merchants' Chamber for the years 1944-45 and 1952-53.

== Other faculty ==
He was an avid photographer and served as president of the Photographic Society of India for the years 1941 – 1942.

He was appointed a minister (Rajamantri) of Porbander State and was also honored with the Rajbhooshan title by the Porbandar State.

Further, the Princely State of Baroda also honored him with a Silver Medal.

He was also made the Justice of the Peace and Honorary Presidency Magistrate for the City of Bombay by British Indian Government.

He was founded Swadeshi League Trust, which held exhibition for local goods and embolden swadeshi movement.

He was the co founder of Bharatiya Vidya Bhavan's educational institutions.

== Death ==
He died in Bombay on 25 July 1956, aged 66.

== Memorials ==
The Bharatiya Vidya Bhavan's The Bhavan's College of Communication and Management at Bombay was renamed as "Bhavan's Pranlal Devkaran Nanjee College of Mass Communication in year 1977 after the philanthropic trust founded by him donated a large amount of money for development of college. Also an award, Pranlal Devkaran Nanjee Award - For Excellence in Harmonious Behaviour was instituted in his memory."
