= Wilmot Corfield =

British philatelist

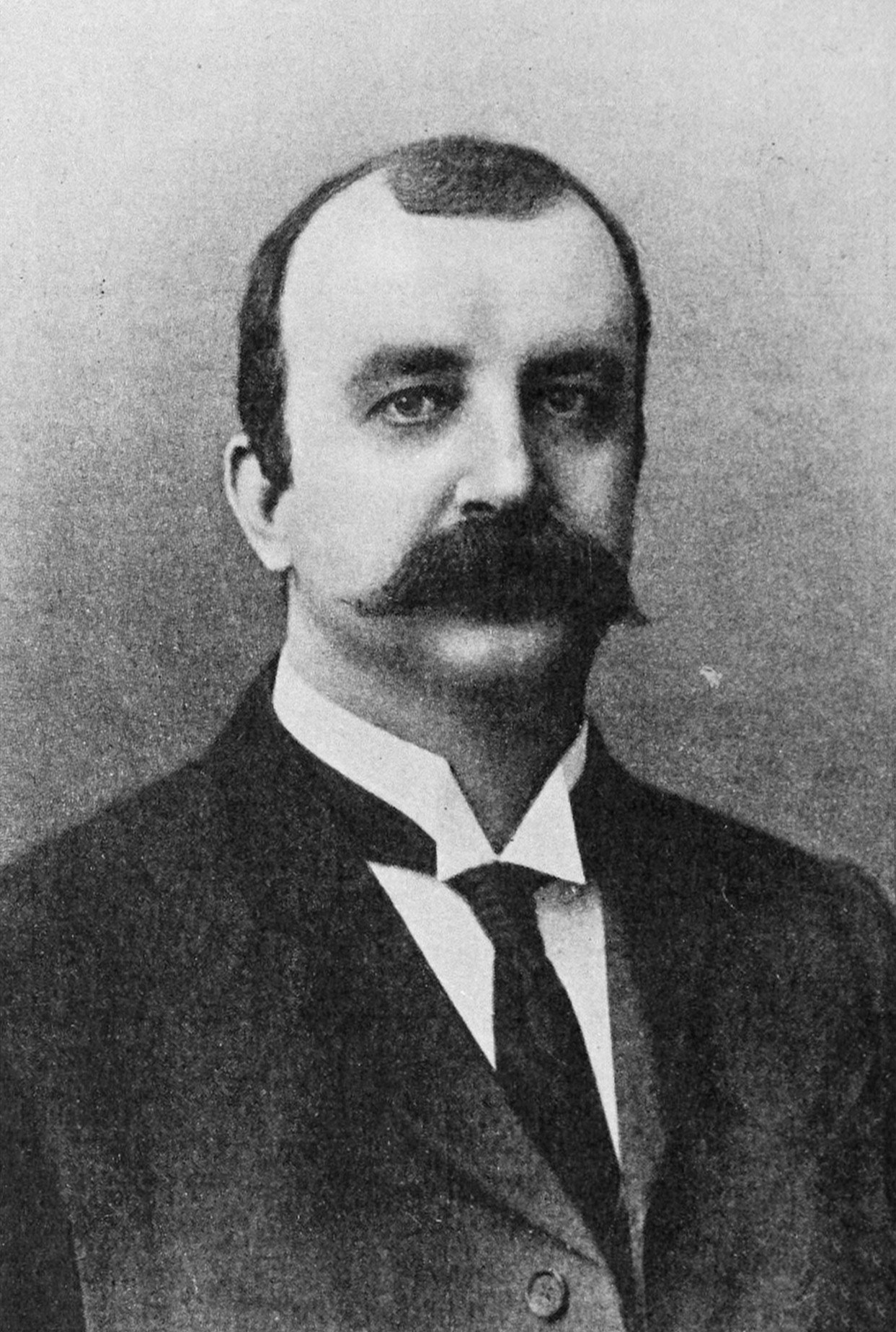
Wilmot Corfield as pictured in The Philatelic Record, 1902.

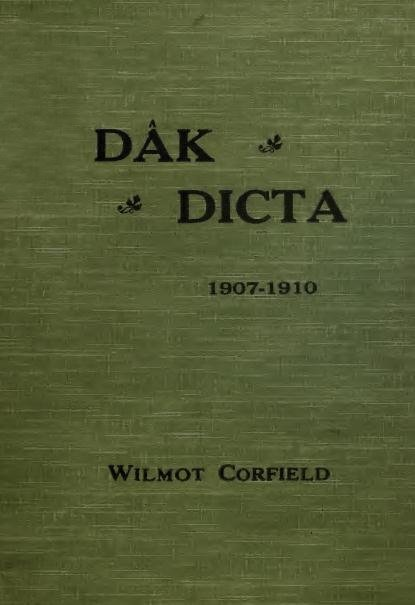
The cover of the first volume of Dâk Dicta.

William Wilmot Corfield (1859 - 27 October 1919) was a British philatelist who was an important figure in Anglo-Indian philately. By his own account, he was an auditor by profession.

== Early life ==
Corfield was born in Birmingham in 1859 and educated at King Edward's School. His mother was Jemima Corfield (nee Randell) who died in 1862. Subsequently, he was the editor in that city of Ye Manual, Birmingham Town Crier and Birmingham Faces and Places and he was a friend of George Bernasconi.

== Philately ==
Corfield started to collect stamps aged six and later acquired his brother, Winter's, collection after Winter died following an accident on a cricket pitch.

In 1886 and also in 1893, Corfield travelled to India where he subsequently became Editor of The Philatelic World (1894 to 1897) and the Philatelic Journal of India. At different times the Hon. Secretary, Treasurer and Vice-President of the Philatelic Society of India (1897-1909). He was also Curator of the Indian National Stamp Collection at Victoria Museum, Calcutta. While in India, Corfield wrote topical verses under the pen name Dâk dicta which appeared in the Indian press, Dak being the Hindi equivalent of "post office". He was active in the Calcutta Historical Society.

Corfield returned to Britain permanently in around 1910 or 1911. He was already a member of the Royal Philatelic Society London from 1899 and of The Fiscal Philatelic Society. He was also a member of the Hertfordshire society, The Junior Philatelic Society (now the National Philatelic Society and the International Philatelic Union. He became closely associated with the Philatelic Congress of Great Britain. He was for a short time Editor of The London Philatelist. He was active in the National Philatelic War Fund and was credited by The London Philatelist with suggesting the design of the souvenir sword of justice stamp produced for the fund. He wrote the obituary of noted Indian philatelic specialist Sir David Parkes Masson in The London Philatelist.

Corfield campaigned for the Tapling Collection to be brought up to date so as to become the British national stamp collection but this ultimately proved impossible due to the terms under which the Tapling Collection had been donated and the scarcity of some of the material missing from it.

== Death ==
Corfield died on 27 October 1919 at Sydenham, South London. He was survived by his wife and daughter.

== Selected publications ==
- Ye manual of the proceedings of the Birmingham Young Men’s Christian Association Debating Society. Vol. 1. Oct. 1881 - April 1882. Birmingham, 1881-82. (Editor)
- The adhesive fiscal and telegraph stamps of British India. Calcutta: Thacker, Spink & Co., 1905. (With C.S.F. Crofton)
- Calcutta faces and places in pre-camera days. Calcutta: Calcutta Historical Society, 1910. Free download here.
- Dâk dicta: a selection from verses written in Calcutta, 1907-1910. Calcutta: Thacker, Spink & Co., 1910. Free download here.
- More dâk dicta. Verses written in Calcutta (1894-1910) and philatelic verses. Calcutta: Thacker, Spink & Co., 1911. Free download here.

== See also ==
- Universal Postal Union Collection
