= Raj Ratna =

Raj Ratna (also Raj Ratan or Rajya Ratna;literally Gem of the Raj) was a title of high honour, a civilian award, which was prevalent in the princely states of India during the British Raj.

== History ==
Raj Ratna awards were given by rulers of the mostly Hindu princely states of India to distinguished citizens of their kingdoms. The title was bestowed with a gold coin medallion.

The second-highest civilian award was the Raj Bhushan (literally Ornament of the Raj), which was given with a silver coin medallion.

The titles and awards of Raj Ratna and Raj Bhushan came to an end around 1949, with the amalgamation of almost all of the princely states into the Dominion of India. The highest civilian award in modern India is the Bharat Ratna, followed by the Padma Vibhushan, Padma Bhushan, and Padma Shri.

== Notable people awarded the title of Raj Ratna ==
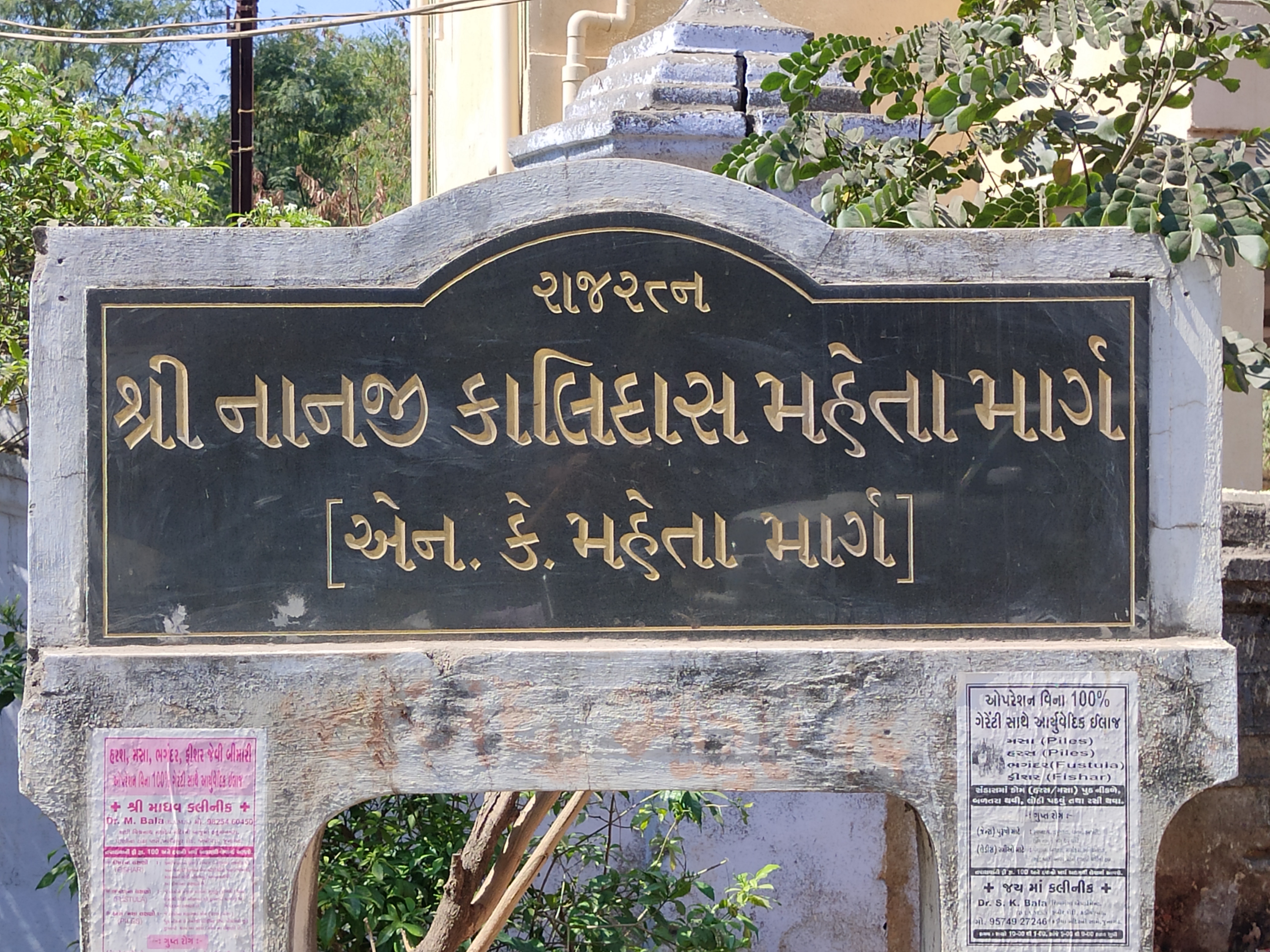
Raja Ratna Shri Nanji Kalidas Mehta Marg in Junagadh, Gujarat mentioning title Raj Ratna in prefix on a road named after him.

- Nanji Kalidas Mehta, M.B.E. – awarded by Porbandar State
- Dinshaw Ratanji Daboo, member of the Baroda Legislative Council – awarded by Baroda State, 1936
- Jagannath Bhandari, lawyer and Dewan of Idar – awarded by Idar State, 1933

== See also ==
- Navaratnas
