= Universal Postal Union Collection =

The Universal Postal Union Collection is a deposit by the General Post Office (GPO) in the United Kingdom, under section 4 of the Public Records Act, of its duplicate Universal Postal Union collection of 93,448 stamps, covering the period from 1908.

== History ==
The stamps of the dominions and foreign countries were not represented in the Museum's collection after 1890. Wilmot Corfield, one of the most prominent figures in Anglo-Indian philately at the beginning of this century, campaigned from 1910 onwards for the augmentation of the Tapling Collection or, if this were impossible, the creation of a collection of modern stamps in some other museum in the London area.

The stamps of the dominions and foreign countries were not represented in the British Museum's Tapling Collection after 1890. At the Fifth Philatelic Congress, held at Edinburgh in 1913, Wilmot Corfield outlined his proposals for the completion of the Tapling Collection and the establishment of a National Collection Committee which would assist the British Museum, on a voluntary basis, in keeping it up to date. E. D. Bacon, in his capacity as honorary philatelic adviser to the Museum, investigated the possibilities of acquiring stamps from the General Post Office. As a result, a parcel of stamps was handed over to the Museum early in 1914. The General Post Office offered to make regular donations of stamps to the Museum, but the offer was declined and, with the advent of the First World War, no further action was taken.

Negotiations between the General Post Office and the Museum in June 1962 and culminated in November 1964 with the transfer of the collection hitherto maintained by the Accountant General's Department. Since then specimens of all new issues received by the General Post Office from the International Bureau have been forwarded to the Museum for inclusion in this collection.

Colonial stamps circulated by the Universal Postal Union from 1885 till 1948 were overprinted or perforated SPECIMEN for security reasons, whereas the stamps given to the Museum direct were in mint, unoverprinted condition. In recent years the study of 'Specimen' overprints has developed as a branch of philately and the main value of this collection lies in the fact that it represents a period when such overprints (and their equivalents in German, Spanish, Russian, Italian, and Dutch) were in use.

There are a few stamps which were distributed through the Universal Postal Union but which were not subsequently issued in the country of origin. In these cases the only examples to survive are invariably in the official collections. They include the St. Helena I d. of 1903 printed entirely in red (instead of in red and black).

Apart from the interest to the student of 'specimen' stamps the value of this collection lies in its world-wide scope, as it provides the general public with the stamps of almost 500 postal administrations.

As of 2007 the stamps in the collection were held in 228 albums and the postal stationery in 22. There was a small amount of additional material.

== See also ==
- British Library Philatelic Collection
- Royal Philatelic Society London
