= Jal Cooper =

Indian philatelist

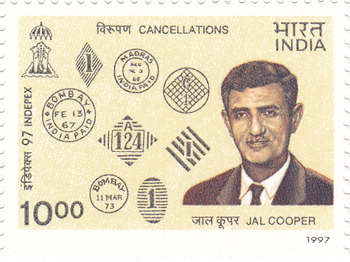
Cooper on a 1997 stamp of India. The postage stamp on Jal cooper is an important source to understand his signature contribution to this field

Jal Manekji Cooper FRGS (29 March 1905 – 2 August 1972) in Mumbai, was an Indian philatelist, and an expert and authenticator of the postage stamps and postal history of India. Cooper was also a Fellow of the Royal Geographical Society and the author of several philatelic handbooks. He was both a stamp dealer and a collector and was associated with philatelists like C. D. Desai, N. D. Cooper, and Robson Lowe.

Cooper is occasionally but erroneously credited with having discovered the Inverted Head 4 Annas. The 1891 reprints show that this error was already known. E. A. Smythies said the error was first discovered at a meeting of the Philatelic Society of London in 1874.

The Jal Cooper Philatelic Society, in Varanasi, India, is named after him and India Post issued a 10 rupees commemorative stamp in 1997 depicting Cooper and Indian postmarks, on the occasion of INDEPEX 97.

== Selected publications ==
- Stamps of India, Bombay (1942), 228 pp.; 2nd edition: Bombay (1951), 226 pp; 3rd edition: Bombay (1968), 177pp.
- Bhutan, Bombay (Sept. 1969)
- Early Indian Cancellations, Bombay (1948) 92 pp.; reprint: Bombay (1991).
- India Used Abroad, Western Printers and Publishers Press of Bombay (1950) 100 pp.; 2nd edition in India's Stamp Journal (1972); reprinted in book form from India's Stamp Journal, Bombay (1972), 86 pages.
- India Used In Burma, Western Printers and Publishers Press of Bombay (1950) 67 pp.
