= Raj Bhushan =

Raj Bhushan / Raj Bhooshan / Rajyabhushan (literally Ornament of the Raj), was a second highest title of honor or civilian award, which was prevalent in Princely India during British Raj.

== History ==
Raj Bhushan awards were given by rulers of mostly Hindu Princely States of India to distinguished citizens of their kingdom. The title was bestowed upon with a Silver coin medallion. The next higher award was Raj Ratna, which was the highest award of Princely India.

The title and awards of Raj Ratna & Raj Bhushan came to an end mostly by the end of year 1949 with the amalgamation of almost all Princely States into India and formation of the Republic of India

However, the legacy, spirit and essence of these awards are being carried forward in independent India, by similar other prestigious awards like Bharat Ratna, Padma Vibhushan, Padma Bhushan and Padma Shri awarded by Government of India.

== Notable people awarded title Raj Bhushan ==
- Pranlal Devkaran Nanjee - awarded by Porbandar State
- Dinshaw Ratanji Daboo, member of Baroda Legislative Council - awarded by Baroda State, 1927. Daboo was further awarded the Raj Ratna in 1936.

== See also ==
- Navaratnas
