= John Raymond Smythies =

British neuropsychiatrist (1922–2019)

John Raymond Smythies (30 November 1922 – 28 January 2019) was a British neuropsychiatrist, neuroscientist and neurophilosopher. He had a long academic career at institutions such as the University of Alabama at Birmingham and the University of Edinburgh.

== Biography ==
=== Early life and education ===
Smythies was born on 30 November 1922 in Nainital, United Provinces, British India, where his father, Evelyn Arthur Smythies, a philatelist, was employed by the Department of Forests. His brother Bertram Evelyn ("Bill") Smythies became an ornithologist. His cousins on the Smythies side include Yorick Smythies, Richard Dawkins (a first cousin once removed), Graham Greene and Christopher Isherwood.

In 1932 Smythies enrolled at Cheltenham College Junior School, transferred to Rugby School in 1936, and thence to Christ's College, Cambridge, in 1940 (18) and to University College Hospital, London in 1942 where he studied medicine (19). He graduated M.B., B.Chir. (Cantab) in 1945.

=== First medical practice and developing interests ===
After two years as a Surgeon-Lieutenant in the R.N.V.R. as ship's doctor on HMS Porlock Bay based in Bermuda, he completed his basic medical postgraduate training at Addenbrooke's Hospital, Cambridge, before selecting neuropsychiatry for a speciality. Two weeks into his first psychiatric residency at St. George's Hospital, London (20), noting the close chemical relation between the psychotomimetic drug mescaline and the neurotransmitter catecholamines, he suggested that schizophrenia might be caused by some abnormality in catecholamine metabolism that produced a mescaline-like substance in the brain. In collaboration with the organic chemist John Harley-Mason and Humphry Osmond, his psychiatric colleague at St. George's, he developed this idea, into the first specific biochemical theory of schizophrenia—the transmethylation hypothesis (5).

=== Training in neuroscience, experimental psychology and philosophy ===
Inspired by the fact that mescaline produces such remarkable effects on all human mental faculties and by the interdisciplinary work of Albert Schweitzer, in the same year Smythies decided to tackle the mind-brain problem in a systematic way i.e. by undertaking a rigorous training in neuroscience, experimental psychology and philosophy. He first worked for one year as a resident in the EEG Department at the National Hospital, Queen Square, London (21). He then took an M.Sc. degree in neuroanatomy, philosophy and cultural anthropology with the neuroanatomist William C. Gibson at the University of British Columbia (22). The neuroanatomical research involved was a study of the synaptic structure in human cortex as revealed by silver staining and was awarded a post-graduate M.D degree by Cambridge (23). His teacher in philosophy was the distinguished American philosopher Avrum Stroll, who became a lifelong mentor and friend. This was followed during the tenure of a Nuffield Fellowship by six months with the Nobel Laureate Sir John Eccles in neurophysiology and 18 months at the Psychological Laboratory in Cambridge with Oliver Zangwill studying the stroboscopic patterns (the complex geometrical hallucinations induced by looking at a flickering light). This work has been extensively reviewed by John Geiger.

=== Academia and publications ===
Then Smythies worked a further two years in neuropharmacology with Harold E. Himwich in Galesburg, Illinois and with Hudson Hoagland at the Worcester Foundation, before returning to London where he completed his formal clinical psychiatric training with Sir Aubrey Lewis at the Maudsley Hospital (25). He then joined the Faculty of the University of Edinburgh for twelve years, first as senior lecturer then reader (26), before being invited to a personal chair at the University of Alabama at Birmingham, funded by the Ireland family, where he stayed for eighteen years (27).

In 1956 Smythies published his first book "Analysis of Perception" (28) on the mind-brain problem in which he presented a new theory — extended materialism — based on an analysis of fundamental flaws in the current orthodox theory (mind-brain identity) and previous work by Joseph Priestley, C.D. Broad, H.H. Price and Bertrand Russell. A second book, The Walls of Plato's Cave, followed in 1994 (17) on the same topic. Robert Almader's (29) described the work as "This is certainly one of the four or five most arresting and compelling books written on the nature of consciousness, the mind-brain problem, and human personality." The theory extends our concepts of consciousness and analyses possible geometrical and topological relations between phenomenal space and physical space linked to brane theory in physics. In 2008, the distinguished British physicist Bernard Carr (30), following a different line of research, presented a very similar theory as the basis for a necessary new paradigm shift in cosmology. In 1998 he wrote Every Person's Guide to Antioxidants (37). Smythies gives an account of his work on synaptic plasticity in his book The Dynamic Neuron (2002) (8). For the last two decades of his life, Smythies worked with Professor Ramachandran's Center for Brain and Cognition at UCSD, latterly on the function of the claustrum as well as the epigenetics of neurocomputation, exosomes and telocytes (37–54).

=== Organisational affiliations and recognition ===
Aldous Huxley, in his work The Doors of Perception, which details the effects of mescaline, credits Smythies with having inspired him to take the subject. Smythies served as president of the International Society of Psychoneuroendocrinology from 1970 to 1974 (31), consultant to the World Health Organization from 1963 to 1968 (32), and editor of the International Review of Neurobiology from 1958 to 1991. He was elected a member of the Athenaeum in 1968 (33). He published over 200 scientific papers and 16 books. Smythies held positions as the Charles Byron Ireland Professor Emeritus of Psychiatric Research at the University of Alabama Medical Center at Birmingham, visiting scholar at the Center for Brain and Cognition, University of California, San Diego, and senior research fellow at the Institute of Neurology, University College London

=== Notable research ===
He made extensive contributions to knowledge in a number of fields including the neurochemistry of schizophrenia (5,6) and the neuropharmacology of psychedelic drugs (7); the functional neuroanatomy of synapses with particular regard to the role of synaptic plasticity, endocytosis and redox factors (8,9); the role in the brain of orthoquinone metabolites of catecholamines (10); the role of virtual reality mechanisms in visual perception (11) and, in particular, theories of brain-consciousness relations (12–17).

=== Personal life and death ===
On 2 December 1950 Smythies married Vanna Gattorno of Trieste, Italy. John and Vanna published their joint autobiography "Two Coins in the Fountain" in 2006 (34). Smythies is also the author of a book of poems entitled "Poems from the Edge of Time" (35), and a satirical play "The Trial of God" (36). He died in January 2019 at the age of 96.
