= E. A. Smythies =

British-Indian forester and philatelist (1885–1975)

Evelyn Arthur Smythies, CIE (19 March 1885 – 10 January 1975) was a distinguished forester and philatelist, born of British parents in India. Smythies was an expert on the ecology of Uttarakhand and Nepal. His careful studies of the earliest postage stamps of India, Jammu and Kashmir, Nepal, and Canada produced groundbreaking handbooks on which philatelists rely, even today.

== Forestry ==
Born in Dehradun, India, on 19 March 1885 to forestry conservator Arthur Smythies (1847- 1934) and his wife Gertrude (formerly Gertrude Aston), Evelyn Arthur Smythies was educated at Cheltenham College, and received his degree in geology and a diploma in forestry from Oxford in 1908, then served in the Indian Forest Service from 1908 until 1940, based in Nainital. He was Chief Conservator of the Forest of Nepal from 1940 through 1947.

Smythies' The Forest Wealth of India appeared in 1924. That same year, with C. G. Trevor, he authored Practical Forestry Management.

Smythies and Jim Corbett proposed that an area around Ramnagar be made a "National Park" to protect the threatened tigers and other living things. These include the tiger, elephant, chital, sambar, nilgai, gharial, King Cobra, Indian muntjac, wild boar, hedgehog, common musk shrew, flying fox, Indian Pangolin, and nearly 600 species of birds. In 1936, the Hailey National Park came into being as India's first National Park. It was renamed the Ramganga National Park after India's Independence, but later it was renamed the Jim Corbett National Park in today's Uttarakhand.

== Philately ==
The Half Anna Lithographed Stamps of India, a monograph by Smythies and Denys R. Martin appeared in 1927. Martin and Smythies also produced a pioneering study of the 1854 Four Annas, which won the 1932 Crawford Medal of the Royal Philatelic Society London. Other Smythies monographs appeared on the stamps of Nepal, written with L. E. Dawson and H. D. S. Haverbeck; and on Jammu and Kashmir, written with L. E. Dawson.

In 1956 Smythies' interest shifted to Canadian stamps and postal history. He focused on British North America but also included Canadian cancels, duplex cancels, registered stamps, precancels, rollers, secret dates, Admirals and perforations. Forgers held a special interest for Smythies: these include Jean de Sperati, Angelo Panelli and Philip Spiro.

Smythies was active in the philatelic community. He was a Fellow of the Royal Philatelic Society London and the Canadian Philatelic Society of Great Britain. He was also a leading member of the Philatelic Society of India, the editor of their journal in 1947, and permanent Vice-President.

Smythies was honoured as a Companion of the Indian Empire.

== Family ==
E. A. Smythies was the elder brother of Bernard 'Bunny' Smythies (father of Yorick Smythies) and of Enid Smythies (Richard Dawkins' paternal grandmother). E. A. Smythies' wife Olive Muriel née Cripps was the author of The Tiger Lady. Their elder son, Bertram E. Smythies, was known for his work in forestry and the study of birds in Burma, Borneo and Sarawak. Their younger son, John Raymond Smythies, was a distinguished neuropsychiatrist and neurophilosopher and author of 14 books in these subjects.

== Publications ==
- E. A. Smythies and A. [C. G.] Trevor, Practical Forestry Management: a handbook with special reference to the United Provinces of Agra and Oudh, Allahabad, Government Press, United Provinces (1923) [At Internet Archive]
- E. A. Smythies, India’s Forest Wealth. India of today 4:1–137. London, Humphrey Milford Oxford University Press (1924); Bombay, Calcutta, Madras, Oxford University Press (1925)
- Denys R. Martin and E. A. Smythies, Half Anna Lithographed Stamps of India (1928)
- D. R. Martin and E. A. Smythies, The Four Annas Lithographed Stamps of India, 1854–55 London, Philatelic Society of India and Stanley Gibbons Ltd. (1930)
- E. A. Smythies, Notes on the Government of India Stamp Collection at New Delhi. Delhi. 1933
- E. A. Smythies and L.E. Dawson, The Postage Stamps of Jammu & Kashmir Simplified Philatelic Society of India, The Mall, Lahore (1937) On line excerpts
- E. A. Smythies, Big game shooting in Nepal: With leaves from the Maharaja's sporting diary Calcutta, Thacker, Spink (1942)
- Col. G. L. Roberts and E. A. Smythies, The Japanese Occupation Stamps of Burma. Philatelic Society of India (1947)
- E. A. Smythies and H. D. S. Haverbeck and L.E. Dawson, The Postage Stamps of Nepal The Collectors Club (1952)
- E. A. Smythies and K. M. Day, Canadian Fancy Cancellations of the 19th Century, British North America Philatelic Society handbook (1962). 2nd ed. (1973).
- E. A. Smythies, Canadian duplex cancellations of the Victorian era 1860–1902 2nd ed. Canadian Philatelic Society of Great Britain (1963)
- E. A. Smythies and A. F. Smith, Canadian Registered Letter Stamps and Cancellations-1875-1902 Canadian Philatelic Society of Great Britain
- E. A. Smythies, Canadian roller cancellations, 1894–1930 Canadian Philatelic Society of Great Britain (1965)
- E. A. Smythies B.N.A. fakes and forgeries, British North America Philatelic Society handbook. J. F. Webb (1971)
