= Merchant's mark =

Emblem placed on products

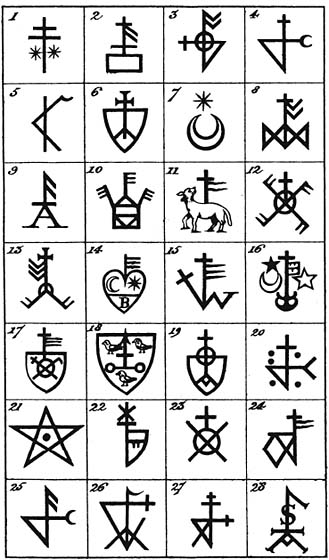
A selection of merchants' marks used by medieval merchants of the City of Norwich, England

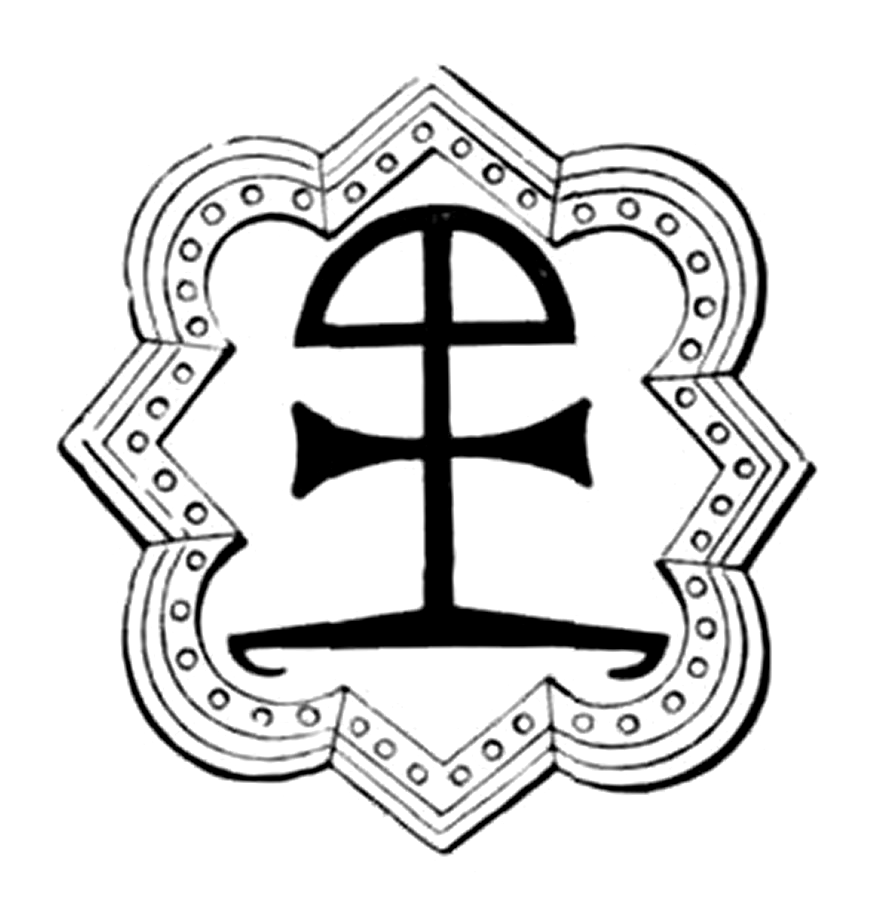
Merchant's mark of Thomas Horton (d. 1530), wool merchant of Iford, Wiltshire, used on English woollens sent to Flanders. Engraved on his monumental brass c.1520 in Holy Trinity Church, Bradford-on-Avon

A merchant's mark is an emblem or device adopted by a merchant, and placed on goods or products sold by him in order to keep track of them, or as a sign of authentication. It may also be used as a mark of identity in other contexts.

== History ==
=== Ancient use ===
Merchants' marks are as old as the sealings of the third millennium BCE found in Sumer that originated in the Indus Valley. Impressions of cloth, strings and other packing material on the reverse of tags with seal impressions indicate that the Harappan seals were used to control economic administration and trade. Amphorae from the Roman Empire can sometimes be traced to their sources from the inscriptions on their handles. Commercial inscriptions in Latin, known as tituli picti, appear on Roman containers used for trade.

=== Middle ages and early modern period ===
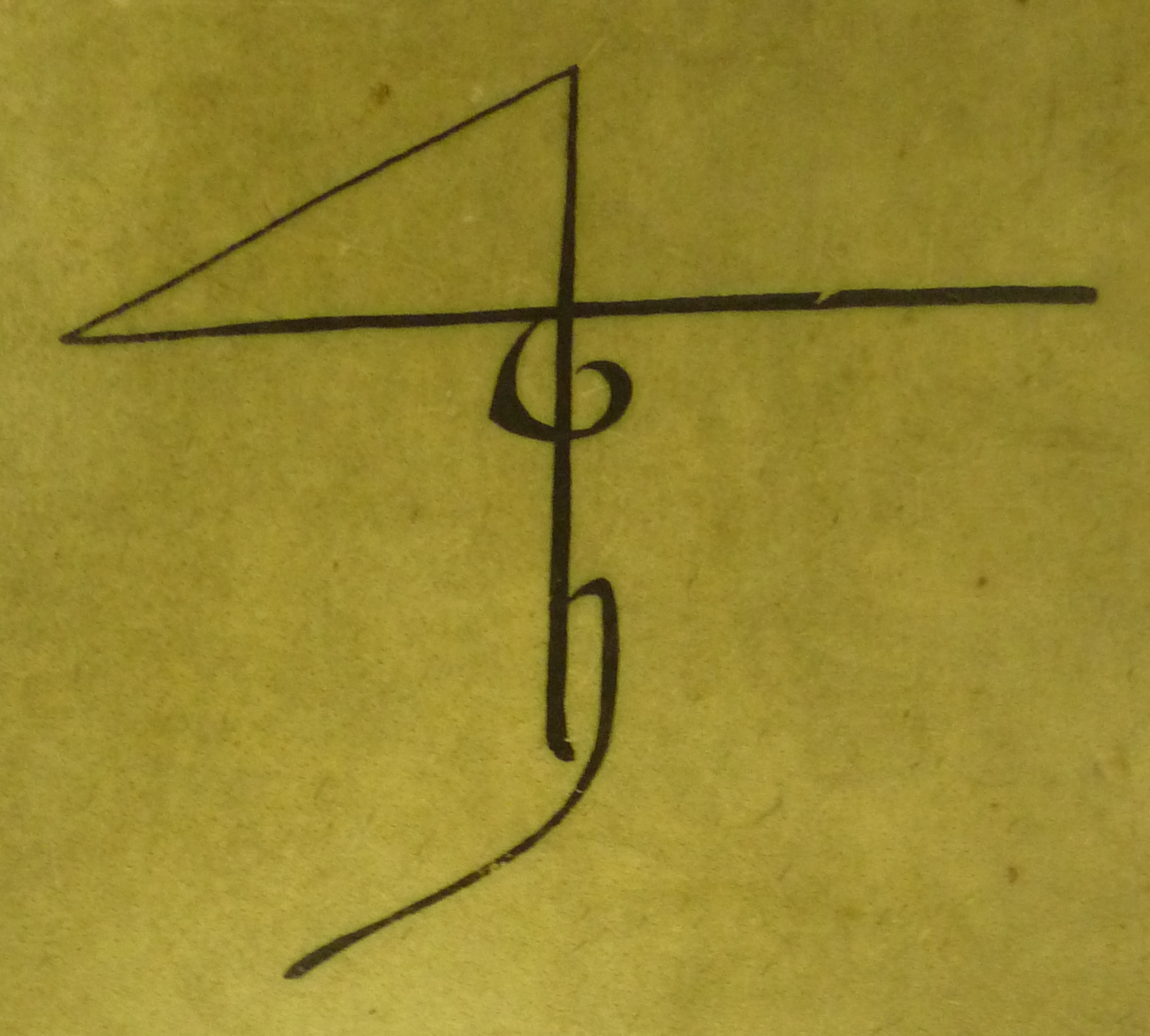
Mark of the wealthy London Draper, Thomas Howell, on the cover of his Ledger c.1517

Symbolic merchants' marks continued to be used by artisans and townspeople of the medieval and early modern eras to identify themselves and authenticate their goods. These distinctive and easily recognizable marks often appeared in their seals on documents and on products made for sale. They are often found on headstones, the covers of commercial ledgers, and in works of stained glass, brass, and stone, serving in place of heraldic imagery, which could not be used by the middle classes. They were the precursors of hallmarks, printer's marks, and trademarks.

==== Legal requirements and superstitions ====
The Mystical Sign of Four, also called the "Staff of Mercury"

To manage the risks of piracy or shipwreck, merchants often consigned a cargo to several vessels or caravans; a mark on a bale established legal ownership and avoided confusion. Early travellers, voyagers and merchants displayed their merchant's marks as well to ward off evil. Adventurous travellers and sailors ascribed the terrors and perils of their life to the wrath of the Devil. To counter these dangers merchants employed all sorts of religious and magical means to place their caravans, ships and merchandise under the protection of God and His Saints.

One such symbol combined the mystical "Sign of Four" with the merchant's name or initials. The "Sign of Four" was an outgrowth of an ancient symbol adopted by the Romans and by Christianity, Chi Rho (XP), standing for the first two letters of Christus in Greek letters; this was simplified to a reversed "4" in medieval times. The evolution of this symbol is shown in M. J. Shah's article. The "Sign of Four" is called the "Staff of Mercury" (Caduceus) in German and Scandinavian literature on house marks.

The joint stock company or limited liability company was another way to reduce a merchant's risks of loss of ships and merchandise from dangerous voyages and travel. By royal charter a monopoly was assured and a merchant's personal liability was limited to the amount of his own investment. If a voyage succeeded the gains accrued to all of the investors in proportion to their invested capital shares. Modern institutions, corporations and trademarks, find some of their origins in these symbolic and legal devices for limiting physical and pecuniary risks.

==== East India Company ====
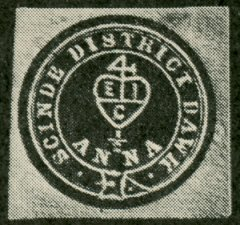
Symbols on a blue Scinde Dawk postage stamp (1852)

When the East India Company was chartered by Elizabeth I, Queen of England in 1600 it was still customary for each merchant or Company of Merchant Adventurers to have a distinguishing mark which included the "Sign of Four" and served as a trademark. The East India Company's mark was made up from a '+', a '4' and the initials EIC.

This mark forms the central emblem displayed on the Scinde Dawk postage stamps. Also, it was a central motif of the East India Company's coinage.

== See also ==
- Brand
- Seal (emblem)
- Factory mark
- House mark
- Livestock branding § Symbols and terminology
- Mason's mark
- Monogram
- Union label
