= Bertram Smythies =

British forester and ornithologist

Bertram Evelyn (Bill) Smythies (11 July 1912 (Nainital, India) – 27 June 1999 (Redhill, England)) was a British forester and ornithologist.

== Life ==
Bertram 'Bill' Smythies, the elder brother of John Raymond Smythies, was born in India in 1912. His father E. A. Smythies, was silviculturist of Uttar Pradesh (and, in the 1940s, Chief Conservator of Forest of Nepal). His mother, Olive Smythies, née Cripps, was the author of The Tiger Lady. After school in the UK, Bill read botany and forestry at Balliol College, Oxford.

Bill's grandfather Arthur Smythies (1847- 1934) came to India in 1873 to join the Indian Forest Service and served until 1902 around Dehra Dun. Bill's father Evelyn (Arthur's son) had degrees in forestry and geology from Oxford and served in the Indian Forest Service from 1908 to 1940. Evelyn was based in Nainital, where Bill was born in 1912. He wrote: ... "started hill trekking at the age of six months, camping in tents in the hills of Kumaon... brought up within sight of Nanda Devi and Trisul - who could fail to have a love of mountains and natural history?"

Bill Smythies' father took up a contract post of Forest Advisor to the Maharaja of Nepal and moved to Kathmandu after 1940 and stayed on till 1947. During this time Bill used to visit his father in Nepal and had access to places that were normally out of bounds for foreigners. Bill Smythies joined the Burma Forest Service in 1934. During this time he explored the botany and ornithology of these Burmese regions with his Kachin guide and friend Sumdu Mai. He spoke fluent Burmese, Jingpo, Malay and Iban. He was a great fan of the British botanist and explorer Kingdon-Ward.

In January 1949 Bill was appointed to the Colonial Forest Service in Sarawak where he spent 15 years. At the age of 52, the day he left Sarawak. in 1964 he married Florence Mary (Jill) Rogers a noted botanical artist. The next fifteen years were spent in the Spanish Sierras, the mountains of Britain, the Alps and the Pyrenees before moving to England. In 1986, Bill Smythies endowed the Jill Smythies Award in honour of his wife whose career as a botanical artist had been cut short by an accident to her right hand. It has been given annually since 1988 by the Linnean Society of London "to a botanical artist in recognition of excellence in published illustrations, such as drawings or paintings, in aid of plant identification, with the emphasis on botanical accuracy and the accurate portrayal of diagnostic characteristics". The entry criteria specifies that the award is for botanical art that it 'an aid to identification and a portrayal of diagnostic characteristics' and excludes "flower paintings that are merely artistic" and "illustrations of cultivars of garden origin." Jill Smythies died in 1994. She was survived by Bill who would die in 1999.

== Works ==
Bill Smythies wrote several major books and papers including:

- The Birds of Burma (first published 1940)
- Birds of Borneo
- Common Sarawak Trees
- Flowers of South-West Europe (with Oleg Polunin and Jill Smythies)
- Flowers of Greece
- Flora of Spain and the Balearic Islands. Englera 3: 1 – 88 (1984)

== General References ==
- Davison, G.W.H. (1999). B.E. Smythies. (In: Smythies, B.E.; & Davison, G.W.H. The Birds of Borneo. 4th edition. Natural History Publications (Borneo): Kota Kinabalu). ISBN 983-812-028-6
- Wright, Belinda.(1999). Obituary: Bertram 'Bill' Smythies. OBC Bulletin 30 (Nov 1999): 7–8.
