= Charles Stewart-Wilson =

Barrister and an official in the Indian Civil Service

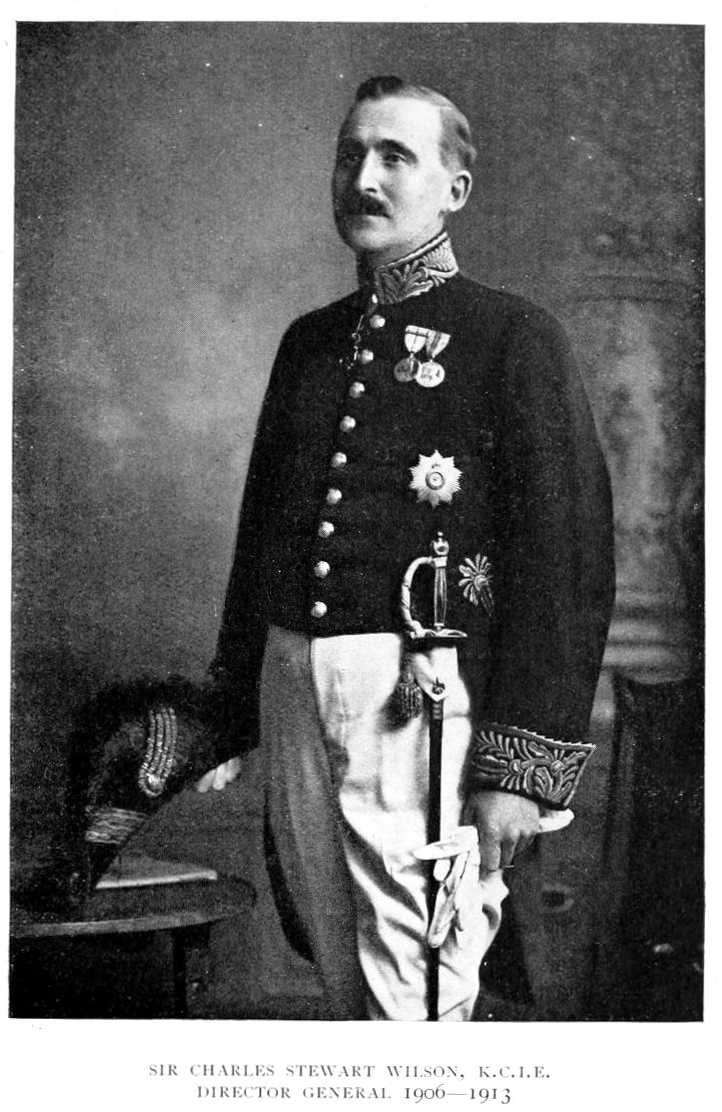

Sir Charles Stewart-Wilson KCIE (1864 – 20 July 1950) was Barrister and an official in the Indian Civil Service who rose to become the Indian Director-General of Posts and Telegraphs.

He was a prominent philatelist and one of the instigators, and the first President, of the Philatelic Society of India. He edited the Philatelic Journal of India from 1898 to 1905 and he signed the Roll of Distinguished Philatelists in 1921. Stewart-Wilson was also a Council Member of the Royal Philatelic Society London from 1915 to 1939.

== Publications ==
- British Indian Adhesive Stamps Surcharged for Native States. Part I. Calcutta: Philatelic Society of India, 1897.
- British Indian Adhesive Stamps Surcharged for Native States. Part II. Calcutta: Philatelic Society of India, 1899.
- British Indian Adhesive Stamps surcharged for Native States. Calcutta: Philatelic Society of India, 1904. (Revised edition) (With B.G. Jones)
- The Postage and Telegraph Stamps of British India. London: Stanley Gibbons for the Philatelic Society of India, 1907. (With C.S.F. Crofton and Leslie L. R. Hausburg.)
