= L. E. Dawson =

Lionel Edward Dawson (1887–1976) was a philatelist who won the Crawford Medal from the Royal Philatelic Society London for the paper The One Anna and Two Annas Postage Stamps of India, 1854-55. He was an expert on the stamps of India and the Feudatory States and signed the Roll of Distinguished Philatelists in 1961.

Dawson was the editor of the Philatelic Journal of India from 1934 to 1944. In 1954 he delivered a paper to The Royal on "The Locally Printed Stamps of Tibet, 1912-1953" which was subsequently printed in The London Philatelist and in 1955 he won the Tilleard Medal from the society for his display of Indian Feudatory States.

A photograph of L.E. Dawson in a tweed jacket appears on page 2 in the catalog of his collection sold by Robson Lowe on 9 November 1966.

== Publications ==
- The Postage Stamps of Jammu & Kashmir Simplified. Lahore: Philatelic Society of India, 1937. (With E.A. Smythies)
- The One Anna & Two Annas Postage Stamps of India, 1854-55. Birmingham: H. Garratt-Adams & Co. for the Philatelic Society of India, 1948.
- The Postage Stamps of Nepal. New York: The Collectors Club, 1952. (with E.A. Smythies and H.D.S. Haverbeck)
