= Denys R. Martin =

Philatelist and writer (1892–1970)

Colonel Denys Richard Martin (11 October 1892 – 1970) was a distinguished 20th century philatelist. As a systematic scholar and prolific writer, Martin illuminated some of the most difficult topics and set a high standard for the study of the postage stamps and postal history of India and Burma.

== Life ==
As a regular British Army officer of the Royal Engineers, Martin arrived in India during the First World War and travelled throughout the subcontinent during the next twenty years.

== Philately ==
Martin's collection included postal history material from the Persian Field Force, the Abyssinian campaigns and the Treaty Ports, which are now in the Government of India's collection.

He was a member of the India Study Circle.

== Awards ==
- Fellow of the Royal Philatelic Society London (FRPSL).
- Crawford Medal for The Four Annas Lithographed Stamps of India, 1854-55, 1932.
- Signed the Roll of Distinguished Philatelists in 1939.

== Publications ==
- Half Anna Lithographed Stamps of India. 1928. (With E.A. Smythies)
- The Four Annas Lithographed Stamps of India, 1854-55. London: Philatelic Society of India and Stanley Gibbons, 1930. (With E.A. Smythies)
- Five appendices in L. E. Dawson, The One Anna and Two Annas Postage Stamps of India, 1854-55. Philatelic Society of India, H. Garratt-Adams & Co. and Stanley Gibbons, Ltd., London (1948): Die I, A Stone, No. 7 - p. 66; Die I, B Stone, Nos. 2, 28 and 64 - p. 67; India, 1854. Pin Perforated - p. 73; One Anna, 1854, Numbers Printed - p. 75; and The Two Annas, 1854, Some Problems - p. 81..
- Pakistan Overprints on Indian Stamps, 1948-49, London: Robson Lowe, 1959.
- The Second Afghan War. 1961.
- The Bombay-Karachi Sea Post Office. 1963. (With G.C. Danby)
- Indian Travelling Post Offices 1864-1891. London: Robson Lowe, 1969. First printed in The Philatelist.
- Numbers in Early Indian Cancellations, London: Robson Lowe, 1970.
- Burma Postal History, Including the 1987 Supplement. London: Robson Lowe, 1971. (With Gerald Davis.)
- Overseas Letter Postage from India 1854-1876. 1975. (editor with Neil Blair)
