= C. S. F. Crofton =

British philatelist

Charles Stanhope Foster Crofton (16 April 1873 – April 1909) was a British philatelist and a member of the Indian Civil Service.

== Early life ==
Crofton was the only son of Major Henry Crofton. He was educated at Harrow and Trinity College, Cambridge.

== Philately ==
Crofton specialised in the philately of India and Ceylon. He had a special interest in the telegraph and revenue stamps of the area. He was a member of the Philatelic Society of India and for a time edited the Philatelic Journal of India. He was also a member of The Fiscal Philatelic Society.

He wrote most of part II (telegraph stamps) of The Postage and Telegraph Stamps of British India. His Fiscal and Telegraph Stamps of Ceylon was published posthumously from his notes after editing by B. Gordon-Jones.

== Death ==
Crofton died from cholera in Ahmednagar, Deccan where he was the resident magistrate and collector.

== Selected publications ==
- The Adhesive Fiscal and Telegraph Stamps of British India. Calcutta: Thacker, Spink & Co., 1905. (With Wilmot Corfield)
- The Postage and Telegraph Stamps of British India. London: Stanley Gibbons for the Philatelic Society of India, 1907. (With L.L.R. Hausburg and C. Stewart-Wilson.)
- The Fiscal and Telegraph Stamps of Ceylon. Ed. B. Gordon Jones. London: Bridger & Kay for the Philatelic Society of India, 1911. (Posthumously)
