= Leslie L. R. Hausburg =

British philatelist and tennis player

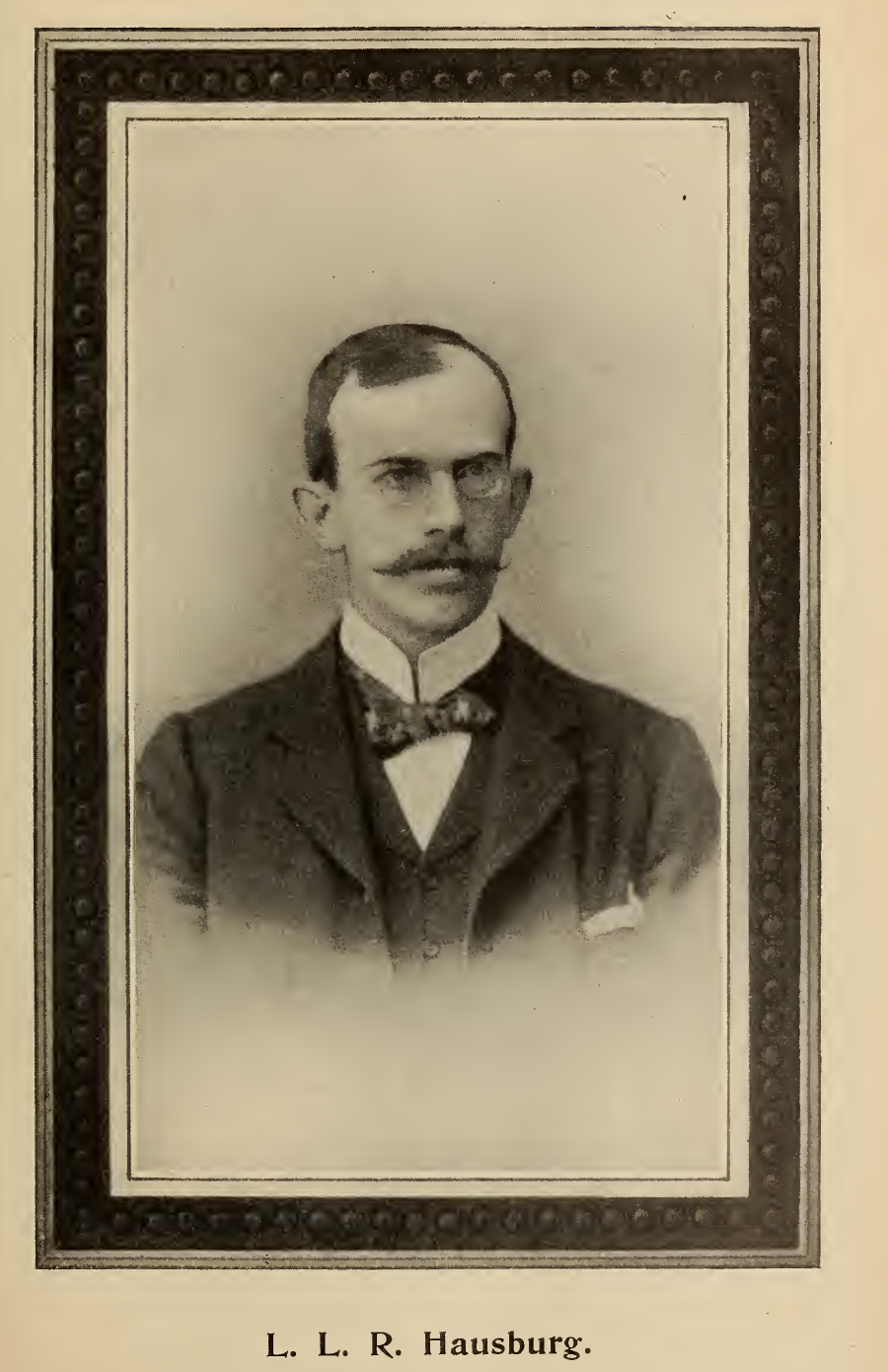
Porträt von Leslie L. R. Hausburg, 1904

Leslie Leopold Rudolph Hausburg (May 1872 – 3 July 1917) was a British philatelist who was one of the "Fathers of Philately". His name was entered on the Roll of Distinguished Philatelists in 1921. He was also a leading tennis player.

== Early life ==
Hausburg, the son of F.L.L. Hausburg, was born at The Glebe, Penshurst, Kent on 26 May 1872. He was educated at Tunbridge Wells, Clifton and then Trinity College, Cambridge where he graduated with a B.A. in the Mathematical Tripos in 1894. He served an electrical engineering apprenticeship with Johnson & Phillips, but never practised. At 23 he married Beatrice Riseley, a member of a noted tennis family. Hausburg played with success at various tennis tournaments including Wimbledon.

== Philately ==
Hausburg was a specialist in plating. He made plating studies of Victoria, Peru, Mexico, and Venezuela, and was an expert on the perforations of the stamps of Australia. He wrote the first part of The Postage and Telegraph Stamps of British India (1907) and his collection of India passed into the Royal Philatelic Collection in 1916. His contributions to The London Philatelist are too numerous to list.

In New Zealand he discovered the original plates from which the first stamps of that country were printed.

== Organised philately ==
He joined the Royal Philatelic Society London in 1892; he was Honorary Secretary from 1913 to 1917 and a member of the Expert Committee of the Society. He was also vice-president of the Philatelic Society of India. He played a key role in running the National Philatelic War Fund and the 1906 International Philatelic Exhibition, London.

== Selected publications ==
- The Postage and Telegraph Stamps of British India. London: Stanley Gibbons for the Philatelic Society of India, 1907. (With C.S.F. Crofton and C. Stewart-Wilson.)
