= David Parkes Masson =

British philatelist (1847–1915)

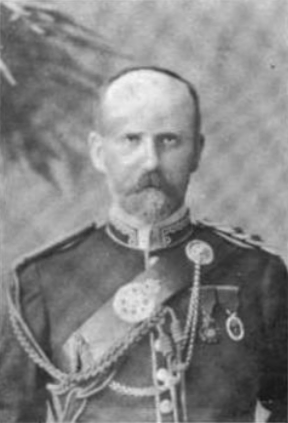
- Born: 1847; Ross-shire, Scotland
- Died: 30 December 1915 (aged 67–68); London, England
- Resting place: Brookwood Cemetery
- Occupation: Banker
- Spouse: Therese Emilie Louise Masson
- Children: 1

Sir David Parkes Masson CIE VD FRPSL (1847 – 30 December 1915) was a British philatelist, who was one of the "Fathers of Philately" entered on the Roll of Distinguished Philatelists in 1921. He was a wealthy banker in India, owned large estates in Malaysia, served as a British military officer, and held a number of important public offices in British India.

== Philately ==
Masson was a former Treasurer, Vice President and President of the Philatelic Society of India and a frequent contributor to the Philatelic Journal of India. He was a member of The Philatelic Society, London, now The Royal Philatelic Society London, and a Fellow of that society from 1899. He formed world class collections of Afghanistan and Kashmir, as well as important collections of Ceylon, Portuguese India, Sirmoor, Poonch and British India. His work showed that the so-called first issue of Kashmir was bogus, a feat which The London Philatelist called "...one of the most memorable and startling of accepted disclosures ever made in philately".

== Outside philately ==
Masson was born in Ross-shire in 1847. He lived much of his life in India. He was Managing Director of the Punjab Banking Co. of Lahore, Karachi and Kashmir. He served as ADC to the Commander-in-Chief and Viceroy of India, and for fifteen years was Lieutenant-Colonel in the 1st Punjab Volunteer Rifles. He was knighted on 20 July 1904. He was a Deputy Grand Master of Freemasonry in the Punjab, holder of the Volunteer Decoration, a Member of the Council of the Lieutenant-Governor of the Punjab and a Commander of the Order of the Indian Empire.

== Death ==
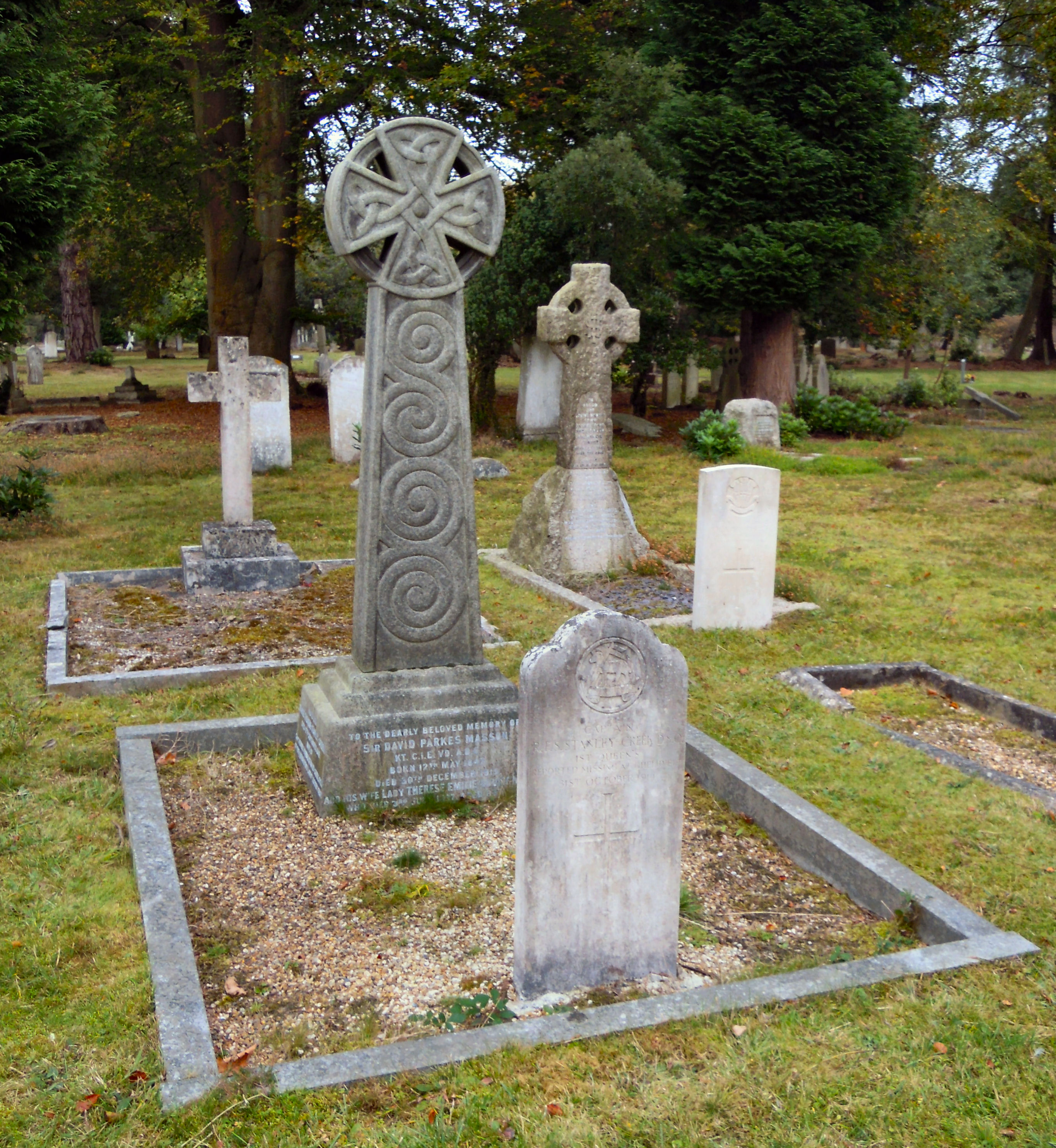
Masson's grave at Brookwood Cemetery

Masson contracted a serious illness while inspecting his estates in Penang and was obliged to return to London, where he died on 30 December 1915. He left a widow, Therese Emilie Louise Masson, and a daughter, Marie Therese Stanley-Creek. He was buried at Brookwood Cemetery on 1 January 1916.

== Selected publications ==
- Jammu and Kashmir. (Two parts bound together) Calcutta & Lahore: Philatelic Society of India, 1900 & 1901. Online excerpts.
- Sirmoor I. Calcutta: Supplement to the British Journal of India, Vol. 10, 1906.
- The Postage Stamps of Afghanistan. Madras: Philatelic Society of India, 1908. (With B. Gordon Jones)
