= The Philatelic Society of India =

- Abbreviation: PSI
- Formation: 6 March 1897; 129 years ago
- Founder: Charles Stewart-Wilson
- Founded at: Kolkata, British Raj (now in India)
- Type: Learned society
- Legal status: Trust
- Purpose: Philately; Stamp collecting
- Headquarters: General Post Office (G.P.O), Mumbai - 400 001
- Coordinates: 18°56′20.2″N 72°50′13.4″E
- President: Dhirubhai Mehta
- Hon. Secretary: D. M. Pittie
- Hon. Treasurer: Surendra Kotadia
- Website: psi1897.com

The Philatelic Society of India (PSI) was formed in 1897 by a group of, mainly, expatriate Englishmen resident in the country as the first all-India philatelic society. During its first fifty years the society included most of the important Anglo-Indian philatelists and had a particularly strong publications record with two award-winning books. The society meets every first and third Saturday at the Mumbai G.P.O., convened by Dhirubhai Mehta, President, and D.M. Pittie, Hon. Secretary.

== History ==
The idea of an all-India philatelic society arose at the Philatelic Society of Bengal in 1896 and an open letter was published by Charles Stewart-Wilson in Calcutta calling for expressions of interest. The first meeting took place at 6 Middleton Row, Calcutta on 6 March 1897 where Charles Stewart-Wilson was appointed the first President and Lady Collen, Professor O.V. Muller and Major C.H.I. Hopkins were each appointed Vice-Presidents. The first Treasurer was Wilmot Corfield and the Secretary Mr. P. Aylwyn Selfe of the Bank of Bengal.

Most of the original members were Englishmen. Mr. C.K. Dutt, of Calcutta, the first Indian, was admitted in 1907.

In March 1957 an exhibition was held in Bombay to commemorate the Diamond Jubilee of the society and in 1997 the Society celebrated its centenary with a display in Bombay titled Centipex '97 at which a red Scinde Dawk and other rarities of Indian philately were exhibited. India Post also issued two commemorative stamps to mark the centenary.

== Early members ==
This is a partial list of early members of the society:

- G.A. Anderson
- Walter Dorning Beckton
- Lady Collen
- Wilmot Corfield
- C.S.F. Crofton
- L.E. Dawson
- C.K. Dutt (First Indian member 1907)
- Capt. Hancock
- Lieut.-Col. G.F.A. Harris
- Leslie L. R. Hausburg
- Mr. T. Hoffmann
- Maj. C.H.I. Hopkins
- John Ernest Buttery Hotson
- Charles Frederick Larmour
- James Lindsay, 26th Earl of Crawford
- Lieut.-Col. C.P. Lukis
- A.A. Lyall
- Lieut. T.E. Madden
- Sir David Parkes Masson
- Maj. du Moulin
- Prof. O.V. Muller
- F.N. Schiller
- Mr. P. Aylwyn Selfe
- E.A. Smythies
- Sir Charles Stewart-Wilson An Indian Civil Servant (I.C.S.), and Director-General of Posts and Telegraphs 1906-1913.
- Mr. E.W. Wetherell

== Publications ==
The society had a strong publishing record with Martin and Smythies' The Four Annas Lithographed Stamps of India, 1854-55 and L.E. Dawson's The One Anna & Two Annas Postage Stamps of India, 1854-55 both winning the Crawford Medal from the Royal Philatelic Society London (1932 and 1950 respectively). The first seven books produced by the society each received volume numbers, although they did not form part of any coherent work. The society's journal, the Philatelic Journal of India, was published from 1897.

- Anderson, G.A. Notes on the Postage Stamps of Bhopal. Calcutta, 1899. (Vol. 3)
- Crofton, C.S.F. and Wilmot Corfield. The Adhesive Fiscal and Telegraph Stamps of British India. Calcutta: Thacker, Spink & Co., 1905. (Vol. 6)
- Crofton, C.S.F. and L.L.R. Hausburg & C. Stewart-Wilson. The Postage and Telegraph Stamps of British India. London: Stanley Gibbons for the society, 1907.
- Crofton, C.S.F. The Fiscal and Telegraph Stamps of Ceylon. Ed. B. Gordon Jones. London: Bridger & Kay for the society, 1911.
- Dawson. L.E. The One Anna & Two Annas Postage Stamps of India, 1854-55. Birmingham: H. Garratt-Adams & Co. for the society, 1948.
- Giles, D. Hammond. Companion to the handstruck postage stamps of India. Bombay: Arvind M. Pakvasa, 1967.
- Masson, Sir David Parkes. Jammu and Kashmir. (Two parts bound together) Calcutta & Lahore: 1900 & 1901. Online excerpts. (Vols. 4 & 5)
- Masson, Sir David Parkes and B. Gordon Jones. The Postage Stamps of Afghanistan. Madras: Higinbotham & Co., 1908. (From notes originally prepared by Gilbert Harrison.)
- Roberts, Col. G.L. and E.A. Smythies. The Japanese Occupation Stamps of Burma. 1947.
- Smythies, E.A. and Martin, D.R. The Four Annas Lithographed Stamps of India, 1854-55. Stanley Gibbons for the society, 1930.
- Smythies, E.A. and Dawson, L.E. The Postage Stamps of Jammu & Kashmir Simplified. Lahore, 1937. Online excerpts.
- Smythies, E.A. and Martin, D.R. "The Half Anna Lithographed Stamps of India". Published for the Philatelic Society of India, Lahore, 1927. Originally, this appeared in supplements to the Philatelic Journal of India, Apr.-Aug.? 1927.
- Stewart-Wilson, Charles. British Indian Adhesive Stamps Surcharged for Native States. Part I. Calcutta, 1897. (Vol. 1)
- Stewart-Wilson, Charles. British Indian Adhesive Stamps Surcharged for Native States. Part II. Calcutta, 1899. (Vol. 2)
- Stewart-Wilson, Charles and B.G. Jones. British Indian Adhesive Stamps surcharged for Native States. Calcutta, 1904. (Revised edition) (Vol. 7)
