= Scinde Dawk =

Postal system

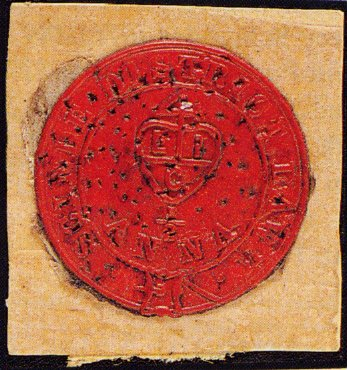
- 1852 red sealing wafer Scinde Dawk stamp
- Country of production: Sindh
- Location of production: Die produced by De La Rue, London
- Date of production: 1852
- Nature of rarity: Very rare
- No. in existence: Less than 100
- Face value: one-half anna

Scinde Dawk (Sindhi: سندي ڊاڪ) was a postal system of runners that served the Indus Valley of Sindh, an area of present-day Pakistan. The term also refers to the first adhesive postage stamps in Asia, the forerunners of the adhesive stamps used throughout India, Burma, the Straits Settlements and other areas controlled by the British East India Company. The name derives from the words "Scinde", the British spelling of the name of the province of Sindh, and "Dawk", the anglicised spelling of the Hindustani word "Dak" or Post.

== Origins ==
The Dawk, or Dak, was a very old postal system of runners. The runners were paid according to their distance of travel and the weight of their letters. This was a local Indus Valley system, inefficient and inadequate for the military and commercial needs of the British East India Company after their conquest of Sindh in February, 1843, following the Battle of Miani.

== Reform of the postal system ==
Sir Bartle Frere of the East India Company became the Chief Commissioner of Sindh in 1850. Following the English example set by Rowland Hill, Frere improved upon the postal system of Sindh by introducing a cheap and uniform rate for postage, independent of distance travelled. In 1851 the runners were replaced with an efficient system using horses and camels, following routes through Scinde province, generally along the valley of the Indus River. The mail was carried quickly and efficiently, connecting government offices and post offices from Karachi through Kotri and Hyderabad up to Sukkur in the north.

== The stamps ==
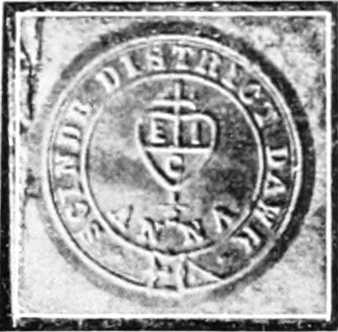
The stamps were embossed

Stamps were required for the prepayment of postage, a basic feature of the new system. These stamps, first issued on 1 July 1852, bore the Merchants' Mark of the British East India Company in a design embossed on wafers of red sealing wax impressed on paper. Because they cracked and disintegrated, they were soon replaced by a colourless design embossed on white paper which was hard to see in a dim light. The last stamps were a blue embossing on white paper. All of these had a value of only one-half anna each, but today they rank among the rare classics of philately.

== Forgeries ==
Forgeries of these rare stamps are plentiful. The most easily detected fakes are not embossed on paper. Other crude fakes show a misalignment of the second letter 'A' of ANNA with the 'K' of DAWK; and in other fakes the '1/2' is not separated from the central heartshaped emblem.

== Later developments ==
After the Scinde Dawk, Colonel Forbes of the Calcutta Mint came up with an essay for a postage stamp depicting a lion and palm tree. This, and several other essays, were never printed because Forbes could not ensure an adequate supply with the limited machinery at hand. Soon after, new, lithographed stamps printed by the Survey Office appeared in several denominations valid for use throughout British India as part of sweeping postal reforms.

The British East India Company's posts are important, because the "Great Company" held sway over so much of the world's commerce in those days, extending across Asia and East Africa. It had its own armies, coinage, and postal service; constructed railways and public works; and acted like an imperial force long before the Empire was established.

== Literature ==
- Robson Lowe, Encyclopaedia of British Empire Postage Stamps, v.III, 1951: The Sind District Dawk, pp. 149–152.
- H.D.S. Haverbeck, "The Sind District Dawk", The Collectors Club Philatelist v. 44 no. 2 (March, 1965) pp. 79–85.
- Mohini Lal Mazumdar, The Imperial Post Offices of British India. Calcutta, Phila Publications, 1990.
- B. B. Misra, "Postal Communications in India, 1773–1834", reprinted from The Central Administration of the East India Company 1773–1834, pp. 415–449. Robson Lowe, Manchester University Press, 1939.

== See also ==
- List of notable postage stamps
- Postage stamps and postal history of India
