= List of philatelists =

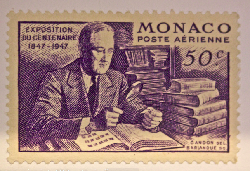

This is a list of philatelists, persons notable for their contributions to philately.

== B ==
- David Beech MBE FRPSL, "Former President of the Royal Philatelic Society London, Head Curator of the Philatelic Collection of the British Library"
- Oscar Berger-Levrault
- Kasimir Bileski
- Ferdinand of Bulgaria

== C ==
- Gustave Caillebotte
- Samuel Chapman, Mexico
- Daniel Cooper, founder and first president of Philatelic Society of London
- Jal Cooper
- J. Howard Crocker, life member of the Royal Philatelic Society of Canada

== D ==
- Paul Darke, founder of the largest recorded collection of disability themed stamps in the world
- Gerald Davis
- C.D. Desai
- Emilio Diena, ancient Italian state specialist

== E ==
- Robert Brisco Earée, Album Weeds
- Edward B. Evans, "Major Evans"

== F ==
- David Feldman
- Adelaide Lucy Fenton, early female philatelist
- Philipp von Ferrary

== G ==
- Cheryl Ganz, Former National Postal Museum curator and Zeppelin mail collector
- Edward Stanley Gibbons, British dealer
- Arthur William Sinclair Gray was an Australian known for his collection of "Kangaroo and Map" stamps
- John Edward Gray
- Colonel Green
- Bill Gross, third person to form a complete 19th-century US collection

== H ==
- Abraham Hatfield, signer of Roll of Distinguished Philatelists and plater of the New York Postmaster's Provisional
- George Higlett
- Heinrich Himmler
- Arthur Hind

== K ==
- Hiroyuki Kanai, Mauritius collection
- Anatoly Karpov
- George V of the United Kingdom, royal collector
- Adolph Koeppel

== L ==
- Pierre Langlois
- Henry G. Lapham, Grand Award at the 1936 Third International Philatelic Exhibition
- H. Dormer Legge
- Alfred Lichtenstein
- James Lindsay, 26th Earl of Crawford, formed massive philatelic library
- George Ward Linn, founder of Linn's Weekly Stamp News
- Robson Lowe, "father of postal history"
- John Luff

== M ==
- James A. Mackay
- Fred Melville
- Foil A. Miller
- Jean-Baptiste Moens, "father of philately"
- Hedley Adams Mobbs
- Walter Morley
- Edwin Müller
- Douglas Myall

== O ==
- Frank F. Olney (1851–1903), Mayor of Providence, Rhode Island and president of the American Philatelic Association for three terms

== P ==
- Alfred Potiquet, first stamp catalogue

== R ==
- Włodzimierz Rachmanow, Polish philatelist
- Hakim Syed Zillur Rahman, collector of medical stamps
- Ayn Rand
- Franklin D. Roosevelt, presidential collector
- L.T. Rose-Hutchinson
- Stuart Rossiter
- Gary Ryan

== S ==
- Lawrence L Shenfield, Confederate postal history
- Sir Ernest de Silva, Sri Lanka's greatest philatelist
- Paul Skinner, Head Curator of the Philatelic Collection of the British Library
- Evelyn Arthur Smythies
- William Carlos Stone, revenues and philatelic literature

== T ==
- Thomas Tapling
- Charlotte Tebay, early female philatelist

== W ==
- Leon Norman Williams

== Z ==
- Robert Zoellner, one of two people to form a complete U.S. collection

== See also ==
- Topical stamp collecting
