= Arthur Grey =

Arthur Grey or Gray may refer to:

- Arthur Gray (rugby) (1917–1991), rugby union and rugby league footballer of the 1940s for England (RU), Otley, and Wakefield Trinity (RL)
- Arthur Gray (Hawkhurst Gang) (1713–1748), one of the leaders of the notorious Hawkhurst Gang, who was executed in 1748
- Arthur Grey, 14th Baron Grey de Wilton (1536–1593), English nobleman, Lord Deputy of Ireland
- Arthur Grey Hazlerigg, 1st Baron Hazlerigg (1878–1949), also known as Sir Arthur Grey Hazlerigg, 13th Baronet, a British peer
- Arthur Grey Hazlerigg, 2nd Baron Hazlerigg
- Paddy Gray (cricketer) (1892–1977), born Arthur Gray, Australian cricketer
- Arthur Gray (athlete), English athlete
- Arthur Gray (golfer) (1879–1916), English golfer
- Arthur Gray (Master of Jesus) (1852–1940), English academic
- Arthur Gray (philatelist) (1939–2015), Australian philatelist
- E. Arthur Gray (1925–2007), American politician from New York
