= Nicholas Masson =

American actor

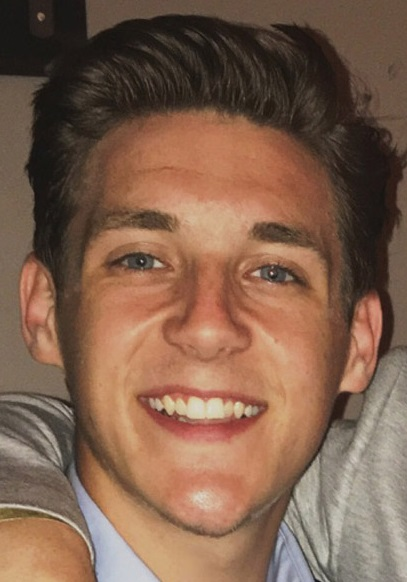
- Nicholas Masson in 2016
- Born: Nicholas James Masson; August 7, 1996 (age 29); Hudson, New Hampshire
- Education: Point Park University
- Occupations: Actor; dancer; singer; teacher
- Years active: 2006–present
- Known for: Newsies the Musical; Chitty Chitty Bang Bang; The Prom

Nicholas James Masson (born August 7, 1996) is an American actor, dancer, singer and teacher. He performed in the national tour of Newsies and the film, Disney's Newsies the Broadway Musical.

== Early life and education ==
Nicholas Masson was born in Hudson, New Hampshire, and raised in Boston, Massachusetts. At the age of three, he began studying dance at DancEnergy in Chelmsford, Massachusetts, and then The Dance Company, in Amherst, New Hampshire. He made his professional theatre debut at the age of ten, in a national touring production of the Broadway musical Chitty Chitty Bang Bang.

Following his appearances in several local and regional theatrical productions, Masson graduated from Alvirne High School in 2014. He subsequently attended Point Park University in Pittsburgh, where he majored in dance.

== Career ==
Masson appeared in the first national tour of the Disney Theatrical Productions' Newsies the Musical, in the role of Mush. He was also a replacement in the role of Crutchie in that production. Masson also appeared in the role of Mush in the Disney film production of the stage musical, which had a limited theatrical release in selected movie theatres in 2017.

In addition to his work as a performer, Masson has also taught at numerous master classes workshops and dance studios, including having served on the dance faculty at the Broadway Connection in New York City as a teaching artist.
