= Raymond Lapham =

American businessman

Raymond White Lapham (December 16, 1903 – July 11, 1976) was an American businessman and philanthropist who served as president of the Boston Garden-Arena Corporation.

== Early life ==
Lapham was born on December 16, 1903, to Henry G. and Rebecca Lapham. He studied geology at Yale University. In 1927 he, along with 14 of his classmates and professor Richard Foster Flint, was seriously injured when a platform the group was standing on collapsed and fell to the bottom of a quarry. He recovered and graduated from Yale in 1928. The elder Lapham was a director of the Texas Oil Company and the younger Lapham worked for time at the company's refinery in Port Arthur, Texas. While there he met Madge Jarratt of San Antonio, Texas. The couple had one son and two daughters.

== Business career ==
In 1940, Lapham was elected president of the Boston Garden-Arena Corporation, succeeding his deceased father. He was succeeded by general manager Walter A. Brown the following year.

During World War II, Lapham served as a captain in the United States Army.

In 1944, Lapham, Brown, Charles I. Keene, and Harry G. Collier purchased Benson's Wild Animal Farm in Hudson, New Hampshire, from the estate of John T. Benson. Lapham continued to own the farm until his death. In addition to his ventures with Walter A. Brown, Lapham was also involved in a number of enterprises with Brown's brother, George V. Brown, Jr.

== Death ==
Lapham died on July 11, 1976, at his home on Prouts Neck in Scarborough, Maine, following a long illness. He was 73 years old.
