= Pierre Langlois =

Pierre Langlois may refer to:

- Pierre Langlois (economist), Canadian economist and political strategist
- Pierre Langlois (canoeist) (born 1958), French sprint canoer
- Pierre Langlois (philatelist) (1909–1990), French chemist
- Pierre Langlois (politician) (1750–1830), politician in Lower Canada
