= Hills House (Hudson, New Hampshire) =

Historic house in New Hampshire, United States

- U.S. National Register of Historic Places
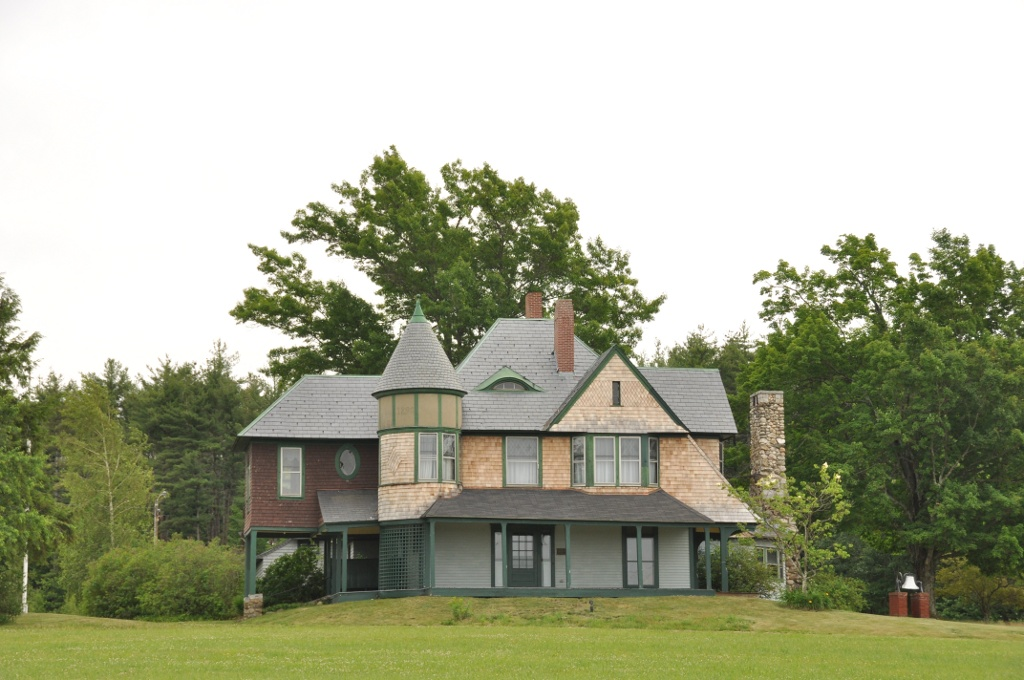

- Location within New Hampshire Location within the United States
- Location: 211 Derry Rd., Hudson, New Hampshire
- Coordinates: 42°47′46″N 71°26′5″W
- Area: 2.5 acres (1.0 ha)
- Built: 1890
- Architect: Ripley, Hubert G.
- Architectural style: Shingle Style
- NRHP reference No.: 83001141
- Added to NRHP: April 8, 1983

The Hills House is a historic house museum at 211 Derry Road (New Hampshire Route 102) in Hudson, New Hampshire. Built in 1890 as a summer country house by a local philanthropist, it is an excellent local example of Shingle style architecture. The house is now used by the local historical society as a museum and meeting space. It was listed on the National Register of Historic Places in 1983.

== Description and history ==
The Hills House is located in northern Hudson, on the east side of Derry Road opposite Alvirne High School. It is a 2½-story wood-frame structure, with a variety of roof lines, projections, porches, and a turret with conical roof. The main roof section is a steeply pitched hip roof, and the building exterior is finished in wooden shingles, with most windows set in rectangular openings. A front-facing gable is enlivened by a small narrow window, and there is an oval window on another front-facing wall. An eyebrow dormer adorns one of the front-facing roof faces.

The house was probably designed by Boston architect Hubert G. Ripley early in his career, and was built in 1890 as the summer home of Alfred and Ida Virginia Hills. Albert Hills was a native of Hudson who practiced as a physician in New York City. The Hills named the property "Alvirne", after a combination of their first names. Hills bequeathed his property to the town for the construction of a high school; Alvirne High School stands on land that is part of this bequest. The Hillses also gave funds for the construction of Hills Memorial Library (also designed by Ripley), and the nearby Hills Memorial Chapel.

== See also ==
- Hills Memorial Library, also designed by Ripley on commission from Hills
- National Register of Historic Places listings in Hillsborough County, New Hampshire
