= Higlett =

Higlett is a surname. Notable people with the surname include:

- Amber Higlett (born 1975), Australian television reporter
- George Higlett (1860–1940), British philatelist
