= Abraham Hatfield =

American businessman and philatelist (1867–1957)

- Born: May 27, 1867; Chicago, Illinois, U.S.
- Died: January 26, 1957 (aged 89)

Abraham Hatfield (May 27, 1867 – January 26, 1957) was an American businessman, philanthropist, and philatelist who signed the Roll of Distinguished Philatelists in 1925. He was "an early plater of the 5¢ New York."

== Biography ==
Hatfield was born in Chicago, Illinois to tea merchant Abraham Hatfield and Cornelia Colgate Leggett, who were married October 10, 1864; he had three younger siblings, Sarah Lee, Nelly, and Harry Wakeman. He was married on October 5, 1905, to Mabel Whitman in New York City; they had two children, George Whitman and Helen.

Described as "quiet" and "austere," Hatfield worked as a sugar merchant and was also a "well-to-do textile manufacturer." He served as trustee, chairman, and librarian to the executive committee of the New York Genealogical and Biographical Society. He was a member of the Society of Colonial Wars and of the Archaeological Institute of America. He was also named a fellow of the Royal Philatelic Society of London, England. He was also a volunteer for the American Red Cross during World War I, where he served as inspector with the rank of captain in France between 1918 and 1919.

Hatfield hired architect Carl Schmitt to design his castle of a home, Stepping Stones, in New Canaan, Connecticut in 1926. The Gothic-style mansion had 40 rooms, and the four-acre property also was home to a private chapel used by the Roman Catholic order of the Fathers of the Holy Ghost. The mansion was known for its beauty, and featured elements like a forty-by-twenty-foot dining room with 20-foot ceilings, a greenhouse, floor-to-ceiling paintings, and a three-story Italian marble & wrought iron spiral staircase. The estate was ultimately sold and converted to condominiums.

Hatfield was passionate about philately, the study of stamps. He is best known in this field for his plating research regarding the New York Postmaster's Provisional, the nation's first provisional stamp to be issued by a local post office in response to the congressional postal reform act in 1845. He took a particular interest in the "5c New Yorks", and was the first person in the field to ascertain that the stamps were printed using a plate of forty positions; by borrowing dealers' stocks of the stamp and the collections of Henry Needham, Congressman Ernest Ackerman, and Alfred H. Caspary, and enlarging photographs of all the horizontal and vertical pairs, he was ultimately able to find enough overlapping pairs to prove that there had been 40 stamps to a sheet. Prior to his work on the subject, collectors first thought the plate had 100 subjects, and then experts had decided there must have been 50 stamps to a sheet; Hatfield's efforts proved that the sheets had actually consisted of eight horizontal rows of five. Hatfield wrote The New York Postmaster's Stamp, which was published in 1921 by the Scott Stamp and Coin Company. The book discusses the plating of the stamp, and also the types of paper that may have been used to produce it:

Personally I am inclined to the opinion that time and conditions have had a large part in the making of many of these varieties, and would reduce the varieties to Blue, Gray and Bluish. The bluish tint could easily have faded, and time would assist in the so-called yellowish tints. I do not think the so-called white paper was ever used and think it but a thoroughly bleached bluish paper. The stamps on blue and gray paper seem to have a distinctive quality that differs strongly from the others in the grain of the paper.

— Abraham Hatfield, The New York Postmaster's Stamp (1921)
