= New York Postmaster's Provisional =

Rare American postage stamp

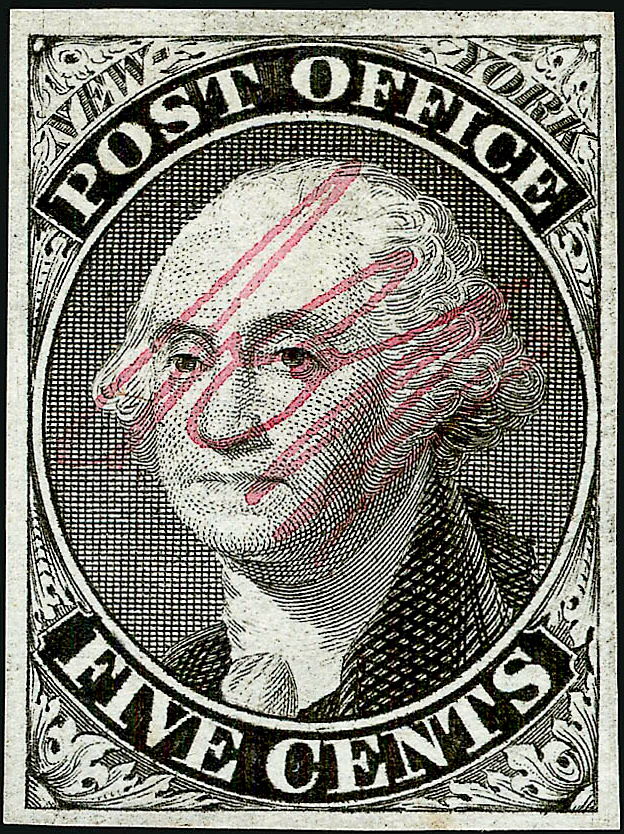
- New York Postmaster's Provisional
- Country of production: United States of America
- Location of production: New York, NY
- Date of production: 1845-47
- Printer: Rawdon, Wright and Hatch
- Depicts: George Washington
- Notability: Most elegantly executed of the U. S. provisionals
- No. in existence: thousands are known
- Face value: 5¢
- Estimated value: $500-$11,000

The New York Postmaster's Provisional is, as its designation implies, a postage stamp provided by the New York Post Office to facilitate the prepayment of mail at a time when the United States had not yet issued postage stamps for national use. Placed on sale on July 14, 1845, this was the nation's first provisional stamp to be issued by a local post office in response to the congressional postal reform act that had taken effect two weeks earlier. That law, passed on March 3, 1845, standardized nationwide mail rates, with the result that the use of stamps became a practical and reliable method of postal prepayment. Before standardization, the many different postal rates in different jurisdictions had made fees too unpredictable to prepay all letters with stamps as a matter of course, with the result that recipients of letters—rather than senders—generally paid the postage on them. Baltimore announced the issue of a provisional stamp one day after New York, on July 15, and New Haven soon followed. The New York issue has been cited as "the most elegantly executed and widely used of the group of provisionals issued by eleven different [U. S. post] offices (Note: The other ten cities to issue provisionals were Alexandria (D. C.), Annapolis (MD), Baltimore (MD), Boscawen (NH), Brattleboro (VT), Lockport (NY), Millbury (MA), New Haven (CT), Providence (RI) and St. Louis (MO).) between 1845 and 1847."

== Production ==
Preparations for issuing the New York provisional were among the first acts of the city's Postmaster, Robert H. Morris, who took office on May 21, 1845 (the previous year he had completed a term as the 64th Mayor of New York). For the production, Morris contracted a leading security printer specializing in banknotes, Rawdon, Wright & Hatch. Creating a design around Gilbert Stuart's portrait of George Washington, the firm produced an engraving plate that printed forty stamp images; experts originally believed the number of stamps to have been fifty or one hundred, but the plating efforts of philatelist Abraham Hatfield in 1921 ultimately proved the sheet to be eight horizontal rows of five. Morris received a bill for $55.01 and the first batch of stamps on June 12, and that day he sent copies of the letter excerpted below to postmasters in Boston, Philadelphia, Albany and Washington, enclosing a sample stamp in each:

My dear sir, I have adopted a stamp which I sell at 5 cents each. The accompanying is one. ... Your office of course will not officially recognize my stamp, but will be governed only by the post office stamp of prepayment. Should there by any accident be deposited in your office a letter directed to the City of New York with one of my stamps upon it, you will mark the letter unpaid, as though no stamp was on it, though when it reaches my office, I shall deliver it as a paid letter. In this manner, the accounts of the offices will be kept as now. ...

While other cities would see fit to offer more than one provisional denomination — Providence printed 5¢ and 10¢ stamps, while the St. Louis Bears appeared in 5¢, 10¢ and 20¢ values — Morris deemed a single stamp sufficient for New York. This decision reflected New York's central location in the cluster of major coastal cities: the 5¢ postal rate covered the cost of transporting mail any distance up to three hundred miles, and little of New York's correspondence went further (the situation was otherwise in Providence and far-off St. Louis).

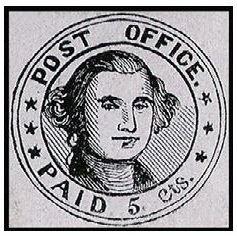
Millbury Postmaster's Provisional, 1846

Given that New York was then the base for most of the security printing firms that produced bank notes and other certificates for local financial institutions around the nation, it is not surprising that New York's provisional stamp would exemplify the highest available standards of design and production. That smaller cities could not necessarily take state-of-the-art printing facilities for granted is shown by the accompanying illustration of the only other Provisional of this era that employed an image of George Washington, printed from a wood-cut die and issued by the Millbury, MA post office in 1846.

The Postmasters' provisionals offered by U. S. municipalities in these years helped familiarize and popularize the use of stamps for postal prepayment in preparation for the eventual national issue, and in this process, the New York issue played a key role.

== Distribution ==
Although New York Provisional, introduced on July 14, 1845, was the first stamp ever issued by a local U. S. Postmaster, its newness proved no barrier to its acceptance by the public; indeed, copies have been found on letters dated July 15. New Yorkers were already familiar with stamps previously offered by private mail carriers. Indeed, they were quite accustomed to seeing stamps that bore George Washington's image. In February 1842, a New York carrier, the City Despatch Post, had printed a rather crude 3¢ Washington issue for use by its customers (the first adhesive postage stamp produced in the Western hemisphere); and the service offered a second version of that Washington stamp with modified lettering several months later when the U. S. Post Office purchased the company as a subsidiary for continued local mail pick-up and delivery.

The New York Provisional was available only at the city's post office, and to guarantee authenticity, the Postmaster or one of his representatives initialed every stamp in red ink. Morris's RHM is present on only a small percentage of the stamps; most of this secretarial drudgery fell to the younger of the two brothers-in-law he had hired as his Assistant Postmasters: 23-year-old Alonzo Castle Monson, whose ACM became ubiquitous.

These provisionals enjoyed wide use. In all, Rawdon, Wright & Hatch made eighteen shipments of the Provisionals to the New York Post office, the last of which — on January 7, 1847 — brought the total of stamps delivered to 143,600. The design and production quality of this issue was so high that when the U. S. Post Office set about issuing national postage stamps several months later, it immediately contracted the firm (now renamed Rawdon, Wright, Hatch and Edson) to print them, bypassing the normal competitive bidding process. The appearance of the first U. S. national postage stamps on July 1, 1847 put an end to the necessity for provisionals. For the 1847 U. S. stamps, the printer furnished a design similar in style to that of the provisional issue but more than 20% smaller in size. No subsequent U. S. definitive issue, even the so-called large banknotes of 1870-1890, would be as large as the New York Postmaster's Provisional.

== Legacy ==
New York Postmaster's Provisionals exist in a welter of collectible varieties which differ widely in value on the philatelic market. Concerned about counterfeit stamps, the postmaster had decided to initial each stamp, with the help of his assistants, which ultimately produced several possible variations on the marking of the stamps. In the Scott catalogue, used copies bearing the most common form of the postmaster's brother Alonzo Castle Monson's "ACM" initialling are valued at $500, but this sum rises for the "ACM" examples in which the letters are connected, or are separated by periods. Unsigned copies fetch still more. Those with postmaster Robert H. Morris's "RHM" fetch several thousands; and even that amount must be greatly multiplied for the inordinately scarce copies bearing the rarest initials, "MM" or "MMJr", those of Alonzo's older brother Marcena Monson Jr. Unused examples also fetch a premium — particularly those with gum, which are quite rare. While most of the stamps were printed on a bluish wove paper, different paper types are occasionally found, and examples on these, too, can be quite costly. The stamps have been a perennial favorite of collectors. For example, Henry G. Lapham received a gold medal at the 1926 New York International Philatelic Exhibition for his collection of New York Postmaster's Provisionals, which included more than 700 of the stamps, including six with the rare "RHM", and a complete plate assembled from forty of the stamps.

== See also ==
- US provisional issue stamps
- A Gallery of U. S. Postmasters' Provisional Stamps, 1845-47
