= Hills Memorial Library =

- U.S. National Register of Historic Places
- NH State Register of Historic Places
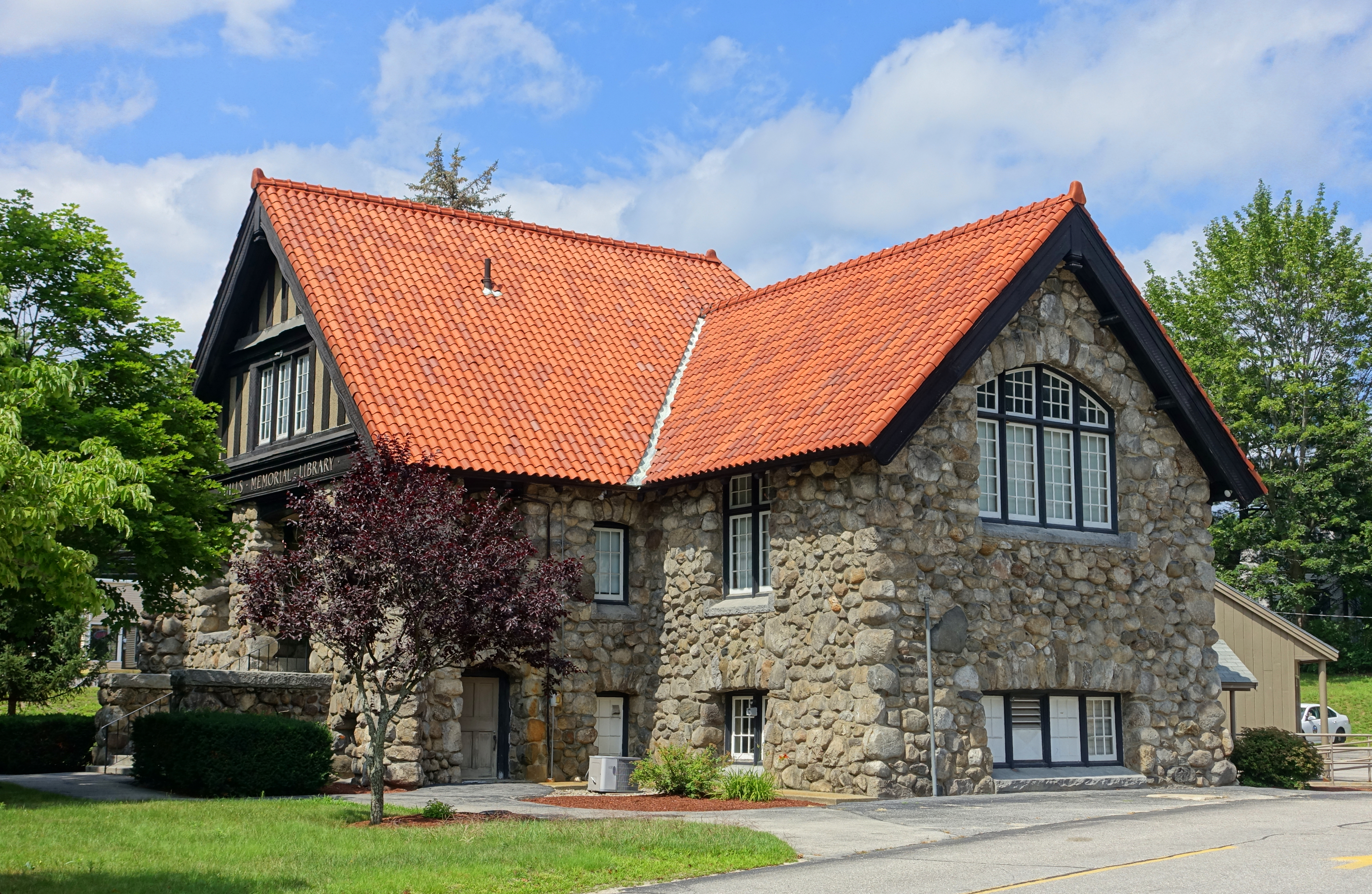
- Hills Memorial Library
- Location: Hudson, New Hampshire
- Coordinates: 42°45′54″N 71°26′17″W
- Built: June 11, 1909
- Architect: Hubert G. Ripley
- Architectural style: Tudor Revival
- NRHP reference No.: 84002812

Significant dates
- Added to NRHP: June 7, 1984
- Designated NHSRHP: April 30, 2012

Hills Memorial Library is the former public library of Hudson, New Hampshire, in the United States. It was erected in memory of Ida Virginia Hills by her husband, Dr. Alfred Hills, and her mother, Mary Field Creutzborg. The land had been previously donated by Kimball Webster for the express purpose of building a public library. The new building was designed by architect Hubert G. Ripley, built during the winter of 1908–09 and opened to the public on June 12, 1909. The building was added to the National Register of Historic Places in 1984, and the New Hampshire State Register of Historic Places in 2012. The town of Hudson closed the facility on May 18, 2009, as the library collection was moved to the new George H. and Ella M. Rodgers Memorial Library.

== History ==
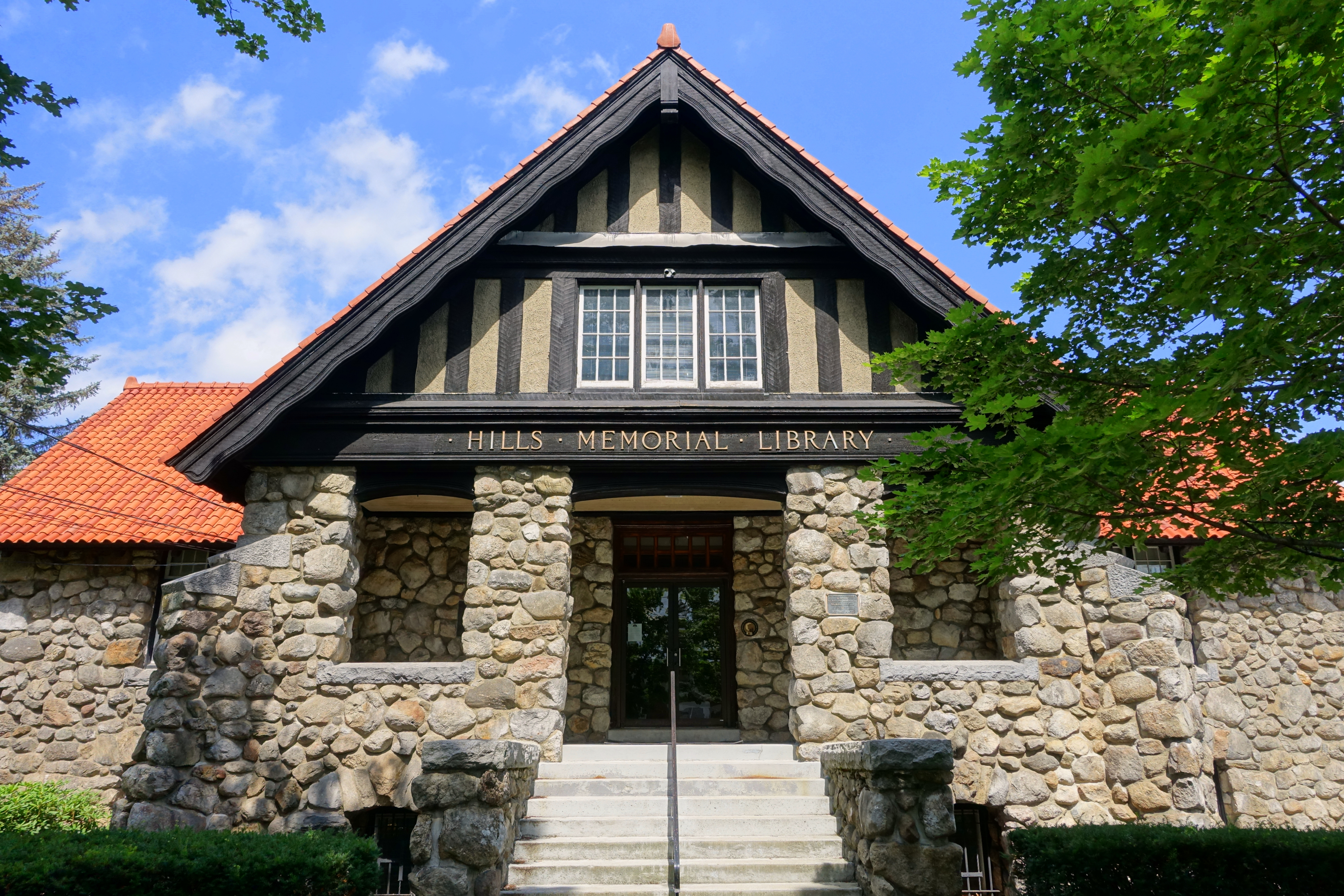
Hills Memorial Library

Hudson's first free public library was established in March 1893 by unanimous vote at that year's town meeting. Kimball Webster, Henry O. Smith and Oswald P. Baker were appointed trustees soon after. Later that same year, the town received a bequest from Dr. Adoniram Greeley, whose will provided five hundred volumes for a free library in the town of Hudson to be selected from his personal library of 3000 volumes. The cooperation of his heirs eventually raised the total number acquired from this bequest to 1889 volumes. The public library was named the Greeley Public Library in the family's honor.

The library, first established in a private home, was soon moved to a location above Baker's Bros store. On September 17, 1904, Kimball Webster, town historian, Selectman and Library Trustee, donated land in the center of town with the requirement that it eventually hold a free standing public library building. A few years later, when Ida Virginia Hills died unexpectedly on May 4, 1908, aged 51, her husband and mother decided to provide the funds to build a library in her memory. The town unanimously accepted the gift on September 3, 1908, and ground was broken the next month.

Construction costs totaled approximately $14,000 over 7 months as the two-story, 70'x50' stone building was completed. In the end, the building contained a total of 2,500 square feet (230 m^{2}) of usable space divided between the main library floor, a small loft above, and a community meeting room in the basement. The new building, called Hills Memorial Library, was dedicated on the 22nd anniversary of the Hills' marriage, June 11, 1909, and opened to the public the next day.

During its first year of operation, under the direction of Librarian Eliza Leslie, 830 residents (out of 1344) signed up for library cards, and there was a total circulation of 5015 items. The collection at the end of the year was 4153 items, 600 of which were donated by Dr. Hills.

The basement meeting room was used by the town for many years for a variety of purposes. The Girl Scouts, the Hudson Community Improvement Club and the Camera Club were among those community groups which met in the space. It was also used temporarily as a public school classroom while an addition was being added to the nearby H.O. Smith Elementary school.

However, the Hudson population and library circulation continued to grow apace through the first half of the 20th century. To meet a need for more space and children's materials, in 1965 the basement was transformed through the efforts of town organizations and the trustees into a dedicated children's room. This was opened to the public on January 18, 1966. The loft, known as the alcove, was also renovated a few years later, with work completed in 1975.

Another addition to library services came in 1977, when the Hudson Junior Woman's Club, the Fire Department, Boyer's Auto Body and the Alvirne High School Industrial Arts department renovated a surplus army vehicle into a bookmobile. Bookmobile service commenced in that same year and continued until 2005 when the second bookmobile was retired due to a need for extensive repairs.

== Current public library ==
View of Hills Memorial Library rear, with trailers visible

Hills Memorial Library was closed upon the opening of the town's new public library, the George H. and Ella M. Rodgers Memorial Library. The new facility opened on May 18, 2009, and was formally dedicated on June 7, 2009. The move coincided with the 100th anniversary of the Hills Memorial Library.

== See also ==
- National Register of Historic Places listings in Hillsborough County, New Hampshire
