= Lionel R. Boucher =

American politician

Member of the New Hampshire House of Representatives from the Hillsborough 19th district
- In office 1984–1990

Personal details
- Born: February 9, 1931 Hudson, New Hampshire, U.S.
- Died: April 5, 2019 (aged 88) Hudson, New Hampshire, U.S.
- Party: Republican
- Spouse: Dorothy Polak

Lionel R. Boucher (February 9, 1931 – April 5, 2019) (Note: Some sources states that Boucher died on April 10, 2019. According to Saint Patricks Cemetery in Hudson, New Hampshire, his tombstone states that he died on April 5, 2019.) was an American politician. A member of the Republican Party, he served in the New Hampshire House of Representatives from 1984 to 1990.

== Life and career ==
Boucher was born in Hudson, New Hampshire, the son of Armand Boucher and Anna Charest. He worked as a general contractor and land developer in his hometown and Windham, New Hampshire, and also worked as a vocational education teacher at Londonderry High School.

Boucher served in the New Hampshire House of Representatives from 1984 to 1990.

== Personal life and death ==
Boucher was married to Dorothy Polak. Their marriage lasted until Boucher’s death in 2019.

Boucher died at his home in Hudson, New Hampshire on April 5, 2019, at the age of 88. He was buried at Saint Patricks Cemetery.
