= Lawrence L. Shenfield =

Lawrence L. Shenfield

Lawrence Lewis Shenfield (October 5, 1891 – October 9, 1974) was an advertising executive who was instrumental in promoting the development of radio broadcasting during its golden age of the 1920s and 1930s. Larry lined up sponsors to help further the popularity of such stars as Orson Welles and Dinah Shore. After his retirement, Larry developed a second career as a prominent philatelist internationally recognized in the field of postal history. His careful studies of the postage stamps and postal history of the Confederate States are relied upon by stamp collectors and experts in philately to the present day.

== Background and business career ==
Dinah Shore with Lawrence Shenfield

Lawrence Shenfield was born in Brooklyn, New York. He received his undergraduate degree in 1914 from Columbia University in New York City, studying architecture, and served in the U.S. Army during World War I, having undergone artillery training in Plattsburgh, New York. After the war, Shenfield worked in New York as an architect for Eggers & Higgins and designed a number of buildings in Brooklyn and Manhattan.

Subsequently, Shenfield left architecture for the rapidly growing field of radio and television advertising. He worked for the advertising firm Pedlar & Ryan, where he handled advertising and public relations for radio broadcasts by Orson Welles. Later, Shenfield became a principal in the advertising firm Doherty, Clifford, Steers & Shenfield. In 1939, Shenfield became acquainted with Dinah Shore and was instrumental in launching her career by promoting the nationwide CBS radio program, Ben Bernie's Orchestra as well as the NBC Radio program The Chamber Music Society of Lower Basin Street. In 1965, Shenfield retired after Doherty, Clifford, Steers & Shenfield merged with Maurice H. Needham Co., forming the predecessor of the Omnicom Group, one of the world's largest advertising holding companies. In 1968, Shenfield returned briefly from retirement to provide support for Doherty, Clifford, Steers & Shenfield's and Merck & Co.'s lawsuit against the Federal Trade Commission concerning truth and fairness in advertising.

== Philatelic career ==
Shenfield was a prominent expert, collector and writer of philatelic literature on Confederate philately. In 1942, he published a pamphlet on Prisoner of War and Flag of Truce mail. Shenfield subsequently was active in the Collectors Club of New York and numerous philatelic congresses. At the 1946 Philatelic Congress, Shenfield presented Letter Unpaid Marking of Louisville, Kentucky. In 1955, the Confederate Stamp Alliance awarded Shenfield the Haydn Myer Award in recognition of his distinguished service to the Alliance. In 1959, along with F. Van Dyk MacBride, Shenfield co-chaired the editorial board for the Dietz Confederate Catalog and Handbook.

Shenfield's most widely known book on Confederate States postal history, Confederate States of America, The Special Postal Routes, was published in 1961. The book is generally known as the best single source for the various special postal operations of the Confederate States of America and is regarded as a major reference work in the area of Confederate philately by prominent philatelic auction houses, stamp collectors and philatelists. Stamps and covers formerly owned by Shenfield in his collection are frequently identified in the catalogues of major philatelic auction houses due to his prominence in the field.

Shenfield died in 1974 and is buried in Woodlawn Cemetery (Bronx, New York), New York. After his death, Shenfield's surviving sons, James Philip Shenfield and Lawrence Walker Shenfield, sold Shenfield's collection of Confederate stamps and philatelic covers at public auction through H.R. Harmer in New York City. Each year, Shenfield's essay on Confederate postal usage and routes is included in the introduction to Confederate States stamps in the Scott catalogue.

== See also ==
- Postage stamps and postal history of the Confederate States
- Philately
- List of philatelic topics
- List of philatelists
- Dinah Shore
- List of Columbia University people
- Woodlawn Cemetery (Bronx, New York)

== References and sources ==
Notes

Sources

- Confederate States of America, The Special Postal Routes (Collectors Club of New York, 1961)
