= Benson's Wild Animal Farm =

Private zoo in New Hampshire, United States, 1926–1987

- Interactive map of Benson's Wild Animal Farm
- Location: 27 Kimball Hill Road, Hudson, New Hampshire, United States
- Coordinates: 42°46′00″N 71°24′20″W
- Status: Defunct
- Opened: 1926
- Closed: 1987
- Slogan: "The Strangest Farm on Earth"

NH State Register of Historic Places
- Designated: April 29, 2002
- Listed buildings: Bush Hill Road Barn; Office and Kitchen; Hudson Center Railroad Sta.

Benson's Wild Animal Farm was a private zoo and amusement park in Hudson, New Hampshire, United States. It opened to the public in 1926 and closed in 1987, after having been renamed New England Playworld for its final year. The state of New Hampshire acquired the property in 1989 and transferred it to the town of Hudson in 2009. It has been redeveloped as a public park and nature area.

== History ==
The zoo was founded by John Benson in 1924 as an animal-training center, and was opened to the public in 1926 with animal exhibits, a miniature train, games and exhibits.

Benson was born in Dewsbury, West Yorkshire, England, circa 1871; he immigrated to the United States as a young man. His career started at Lexington Park in Lexington, Massachusetts, in the early 1900s. Although he was not the owner, he ran the amusement park, which was filled with all sorts of exotic animals, a theater, a women's resting building and other facilities. The women's resting house remains and is now a home. At the time trolleys took Bostonians from Massachusetts Avenue to Bedford Street and dropped them off at the park's entrance, located on the Lexington and Bedford town line. The park finally closed in 1921.

Benson then went to New Hampshire to open his own animal park. After opening to the public in 1926, Benson's was expanded in 1932–33 with the addition of a permanent Wild Animal Circus. A special "Jungle Train" ran from Boston to Hudson on Sundays, with admission to Benson's included in the ticket price. By 1934 the parking lot could accommodate 5,200 cars. In 1940, animal trainer Joe Arcaris began his association with the zoo, performing acts with lions and other animals till the late 1970s.

Benson died in September 1943, and the following year the property was purchased by a syndicate from Boston consisting of Boston Garden-Arena Corporation executives Raymond Lapham, Walter A. Brown, Charles I. Keene, and Harry G. Collier. The farm was managed by Collier, who had previously worked for Ringling Brothers and the Brockton Fair. The park was closed to the public during World War II and re-opened in 1945. Starting in the 1960s, it went into a period of decline in maintenance and attendance. It was sold in 1979 to Arthur Provencher, who reversed its decline for a while with an influx of money. However, the farm remained unprofitable.

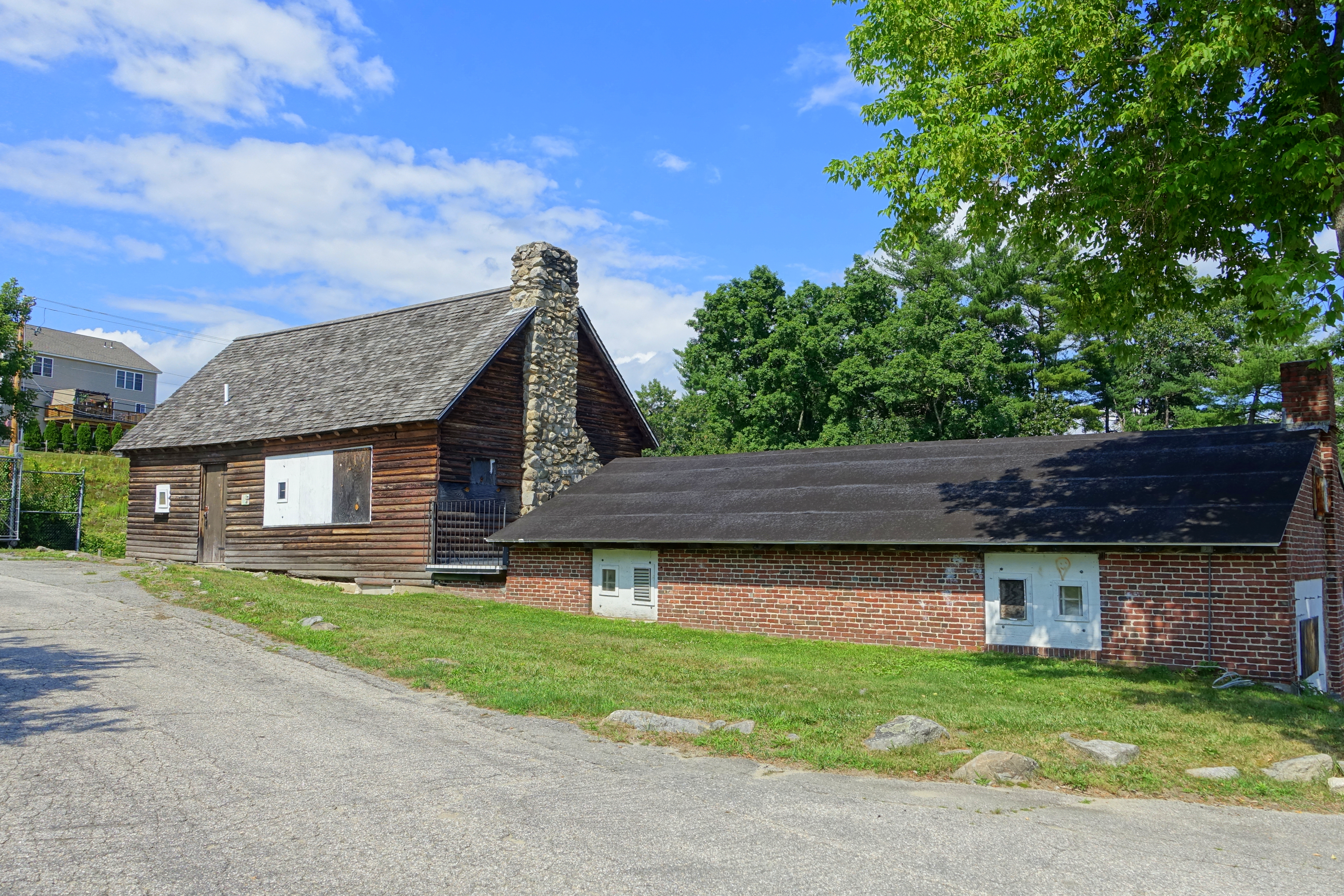
Office and Kitchen (2017)

Toward the end of its existence as a zoo, it had a wide variety of animals, including trained lions, bears of several different species, llamas, a gorilla, elephants, monkeys, and many kinds of birds. With declining finances in the 1980s, the park added features to add family interest. After an unsuccessful association with outside investors, Provencher filed Chapter 11 bankruptcy in 1985. In 1987, he changed it to an amusement park, whose full name was "New England's Playworld Amusement Park and Zoo", notable for a huge statue of Mighty Mouse. This change failed to stem the decline, and the park went out of business at the end of the 1987 season.

In April 2002, three buildings at Benson's were added to the New Hampshire State Register of Historic Places; the Bush Hill Road Barn, the Office and Kitchen, and the Hudson Center Railroad Station. The Hudson Center Railroad Station was moved to Benson's by the town of Hudson from its original location on Greeley Street.

=== Colossus the Gorilla ===
"Colossus", a 500-pound (230 kg) silverback who reportedly was one of the largest gorillas ever held in captivity, was a resident at Benson's Wild Animal Farm for approximately 20 years from the 1960s through 1987. Colossus, whose real name was Tony, once ran for president in the New Hampshire primary as a publicity stunt. He was included among serious candidates and past presidents on a collection of presidential primary trading cards authorized by the New Hampshire State Library, where he was listed as "Colossus G. Benson". Colossus moved to the Cincinnati Zoo in 1993, after spending some time at the Gulf Breeze Zoo in Florida. He was born on May 24, 1967, according to information on the front of his cage. He died April 11, 2006, at age 40, while under anesthesia during dental work.

== Revival ==
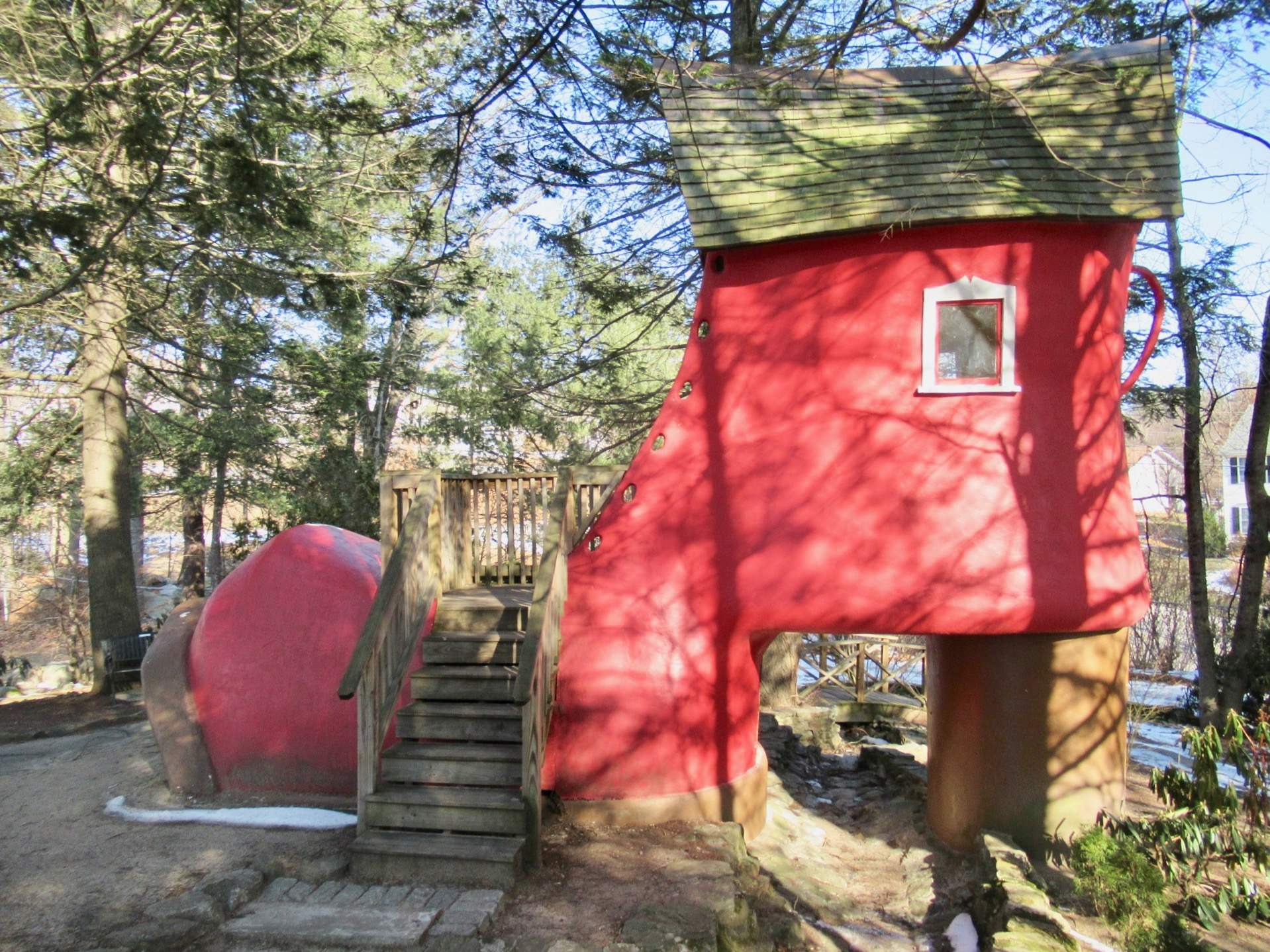
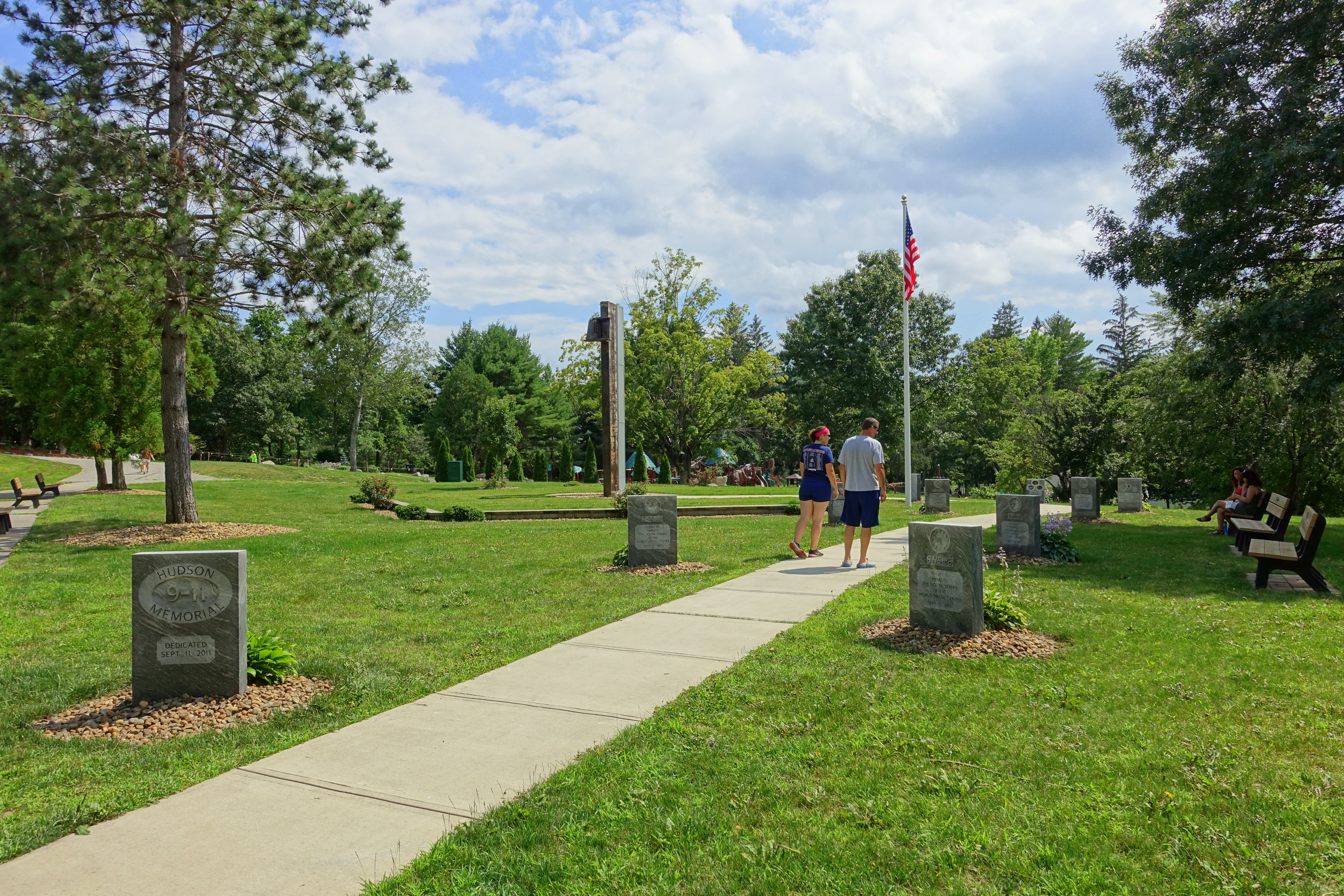
Old Woman's Shoe (left) and 9/11 Memorial

Benson's Wild Animal Farm reopened in May 2010 as a town park for recreational use. There is no admission fee. The Old Woman's Shoe, the elephant house, gorilla house and other structures were repaired after decay and vandalism. An official grand opening and re-dedication was held September 2010.

=== 9/11 memorial ===
On September 11, 2011, a memorial was dedicated to the tragic events of September 11, 2001. A piece of steel from the World Trade Center was placed at the site of the memorial. There are also markers showing a timeline of the events of that fateful day. The pathway through the memorial is shaped to replicate the flight path of Flight 175.
