= Paul Skinner (philatelist) =

- Occupation: Philatelist

Paul Skinner is a British philatelist and head curator of the Philatelic Collections at the British Library.

== About ==
Skinner began his philatelic career in the commercial sector, working for international philatelic auctioneers. He joined the British Library in 2004, and succeeded David Beech as the head curator of the Philatelic Collections. His particular area of interest is in the technology used for security printing and stamp production. He has worked on several exhibitions, including "The British Library Philatelic Rarities" (2010), and "Good Graving is the best security" (2014). His publications include studies on the philatelic bounty of the Pitcairn Islands, and stamps of Northern Rhodesia. He is a member of the Royal Philatelic Society London.

== See also ==
- British Library Philatelic Collections
- List of philatelists
- Royal Philatelic Society London
