= Włodzimierz Rachmanow =

Polish-Russian philatelist

Wladimir von Rachmanow in later life.

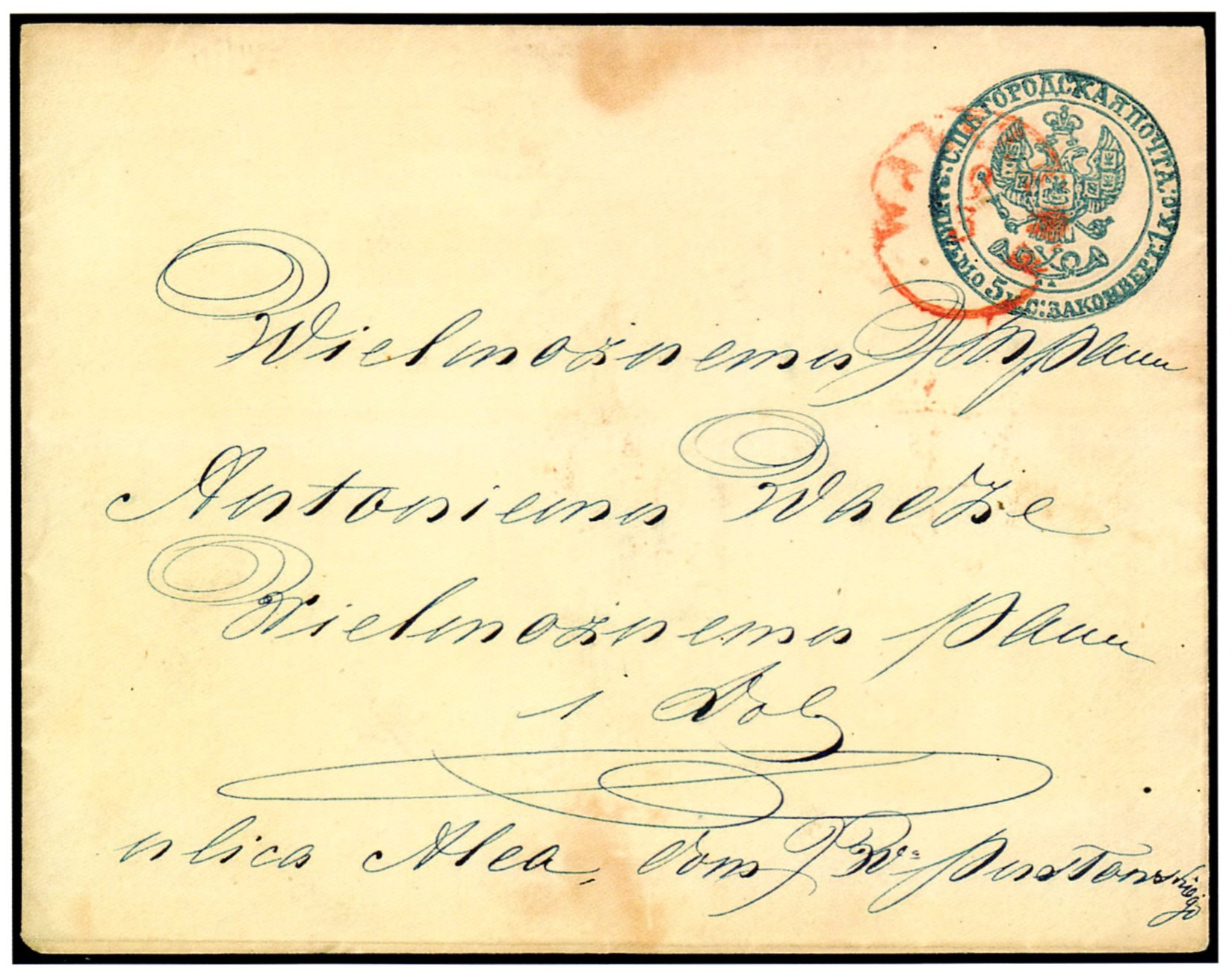
An 1858 Russian postal stationery envelope used as a trial in Warsaw before the introduction of the first Polish postage stamps. One of the rarities in the Rachmanow Collection.

Włodzimierz Rachmanow (Wladimir von Rachmanow, Vladimir von Rachmanoff in later years) (27 April 1886 - June 1968) was a Polish-Russian philatelist who formed an award-winning collection of the stamps and postal history of the Kingdom of Poland. He was also an expert on the cantonal stamps of Switzerland.

== Philatelic awards ==
Rachmanow served on the Grand Jury at Gdansk in 1929 and Berlin in 1930. In 1929. he was awarded the "Académie de philatélie" medal. He won awards for exhibits at Cassel in 1914, Anvers in 1930, Bruxelles in 1935 and Warszawa in 1938.

== Escape from Poland ==
In 1944, Rachmanow escaped Warsaw just prior to the uprising during which his family home opposite the parliament building was reduced to rubble. He left with just one suitcase, in which he placed his stamp collection.

After arriving in the United States, Rachmanow settled in the New York area and went by the name Vladimir von Rachmanoff. He continued to develop his collection and in 1956 won a gold medal at FIPEX New York. He died in Queens, New York in 1968. According to the notes in the Warwick & Warwick auction catalogue of 2010, his collection lay untouched in a safe for over 40 years.

== Sale of the Rachmanow collection ==
The Poland collection of Rachmanow was sold in a Warwick & Warwick auction on 5 May 2010 and realised £680,000.

== Selected publications ==
- Handbook of Polish Stamps. 1925.
- Poland No. 1. 1952.

== See also ==
- Postage stamps and postal history of Poland
