= Carl Schmidt (architect) =

Russian architect

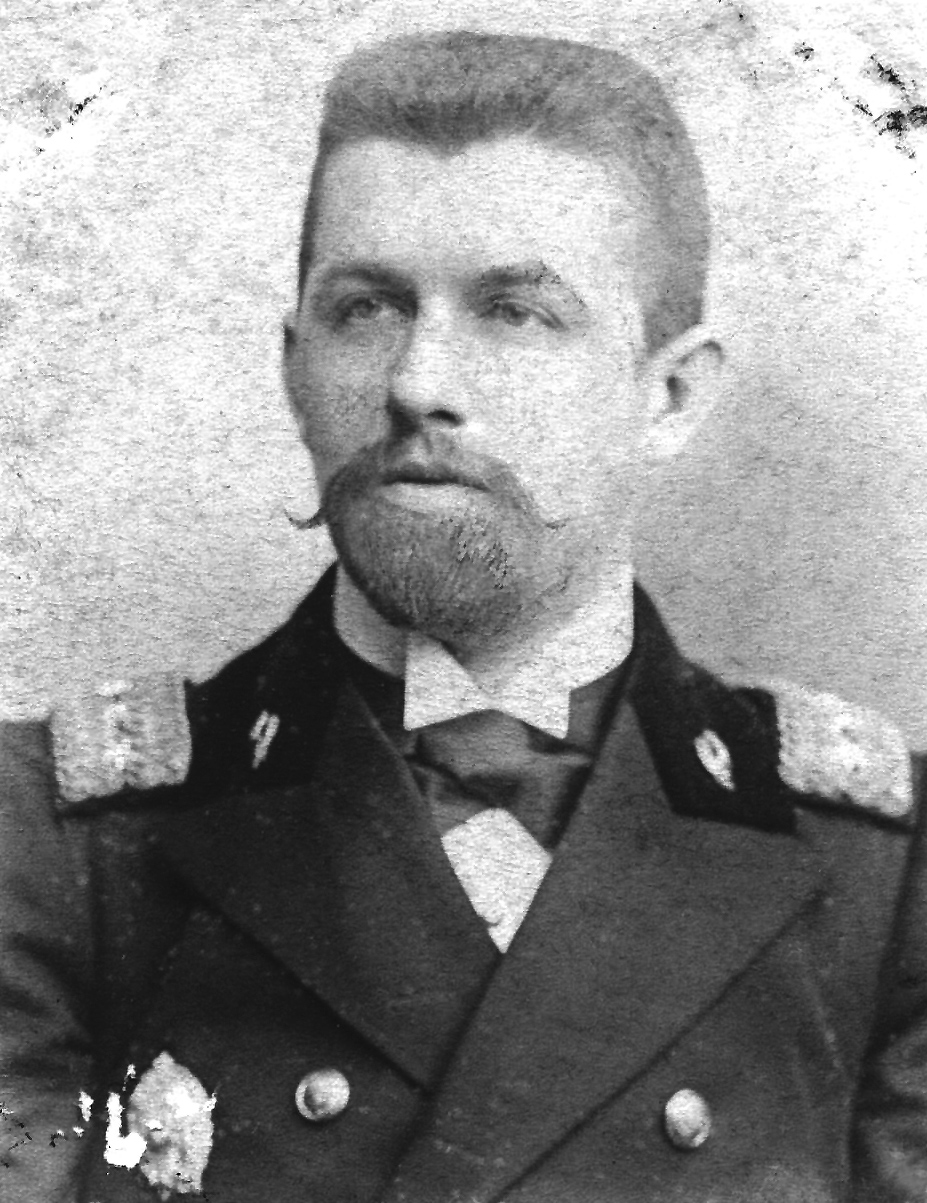
Carl Schmidt in 1897

Carl Emil Michael Schmidt (Russian: Карл Карлович Шмидт, romanized: Karl Karlovič Šmidt;December 21, 1866 – 8 August 1945) was a Russo-German architect and philatelist. Born in St. Petersburg, his father Karl Friedrich Adolf Ferdinand Schmidt was a German marine engineer from Anklam in Mecklenburg-Strelitz and mother Olga Helena Schmidt was a Baltic German. He is known as a representative of the "brick-style" and the early Art Nouveau in architecture.

Carl Schmidt studied at the St. Petersburg Academy of Arts. His villas and houses adorn the streets of St. Petersburg. In autumn 1918 the Schmidt family was forced to leave Russia and back to Germany. In Germany, he could not follow on his architectural work. He died in 1945 in Magdeburg.

== Selected works ==
- 1897/98. Villa of V. Tiss. Sjezzhinskaya ul, 3
- 1897/99. Alexandra asylum for women. Bolshoy prospekt V. O., 49-51
- 1899/1900. Building of the Faberge firm. Bolshaya Morskaya ul., 24
- 1900/01. Villa and the office of Paul Forostovski. 4 liniya V. O., 9
- 1900/04. Own villa in Pavlovsk. 2-ya Krasnoflotskaya ul., 7
- 1901/02. Apartment house. Chersonskaya ul., 13
- 1907. New building for a girls' school of Emilie Schaffe. 5-ya liniya O. V., 16
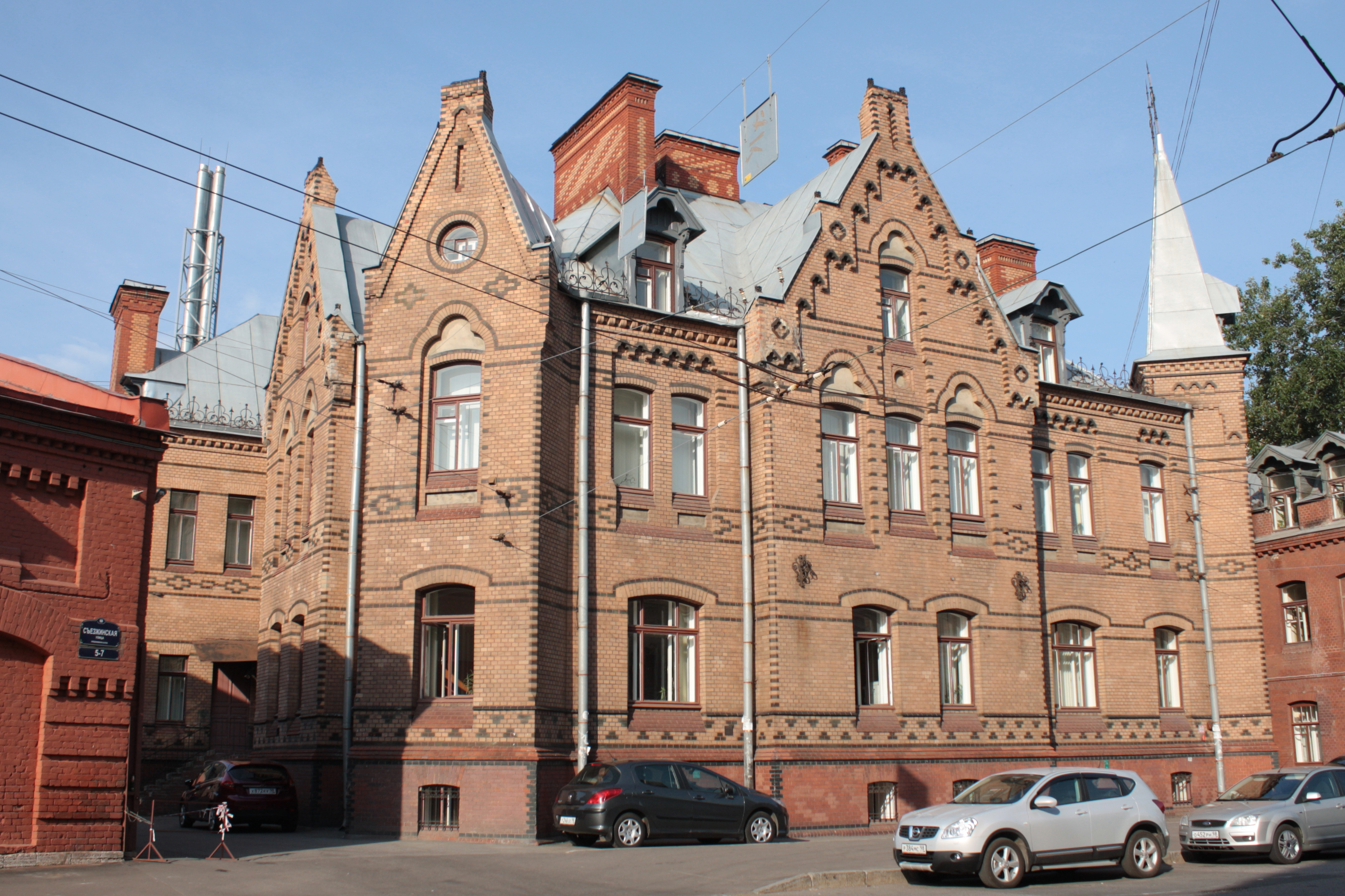
Villa of V. Tiss

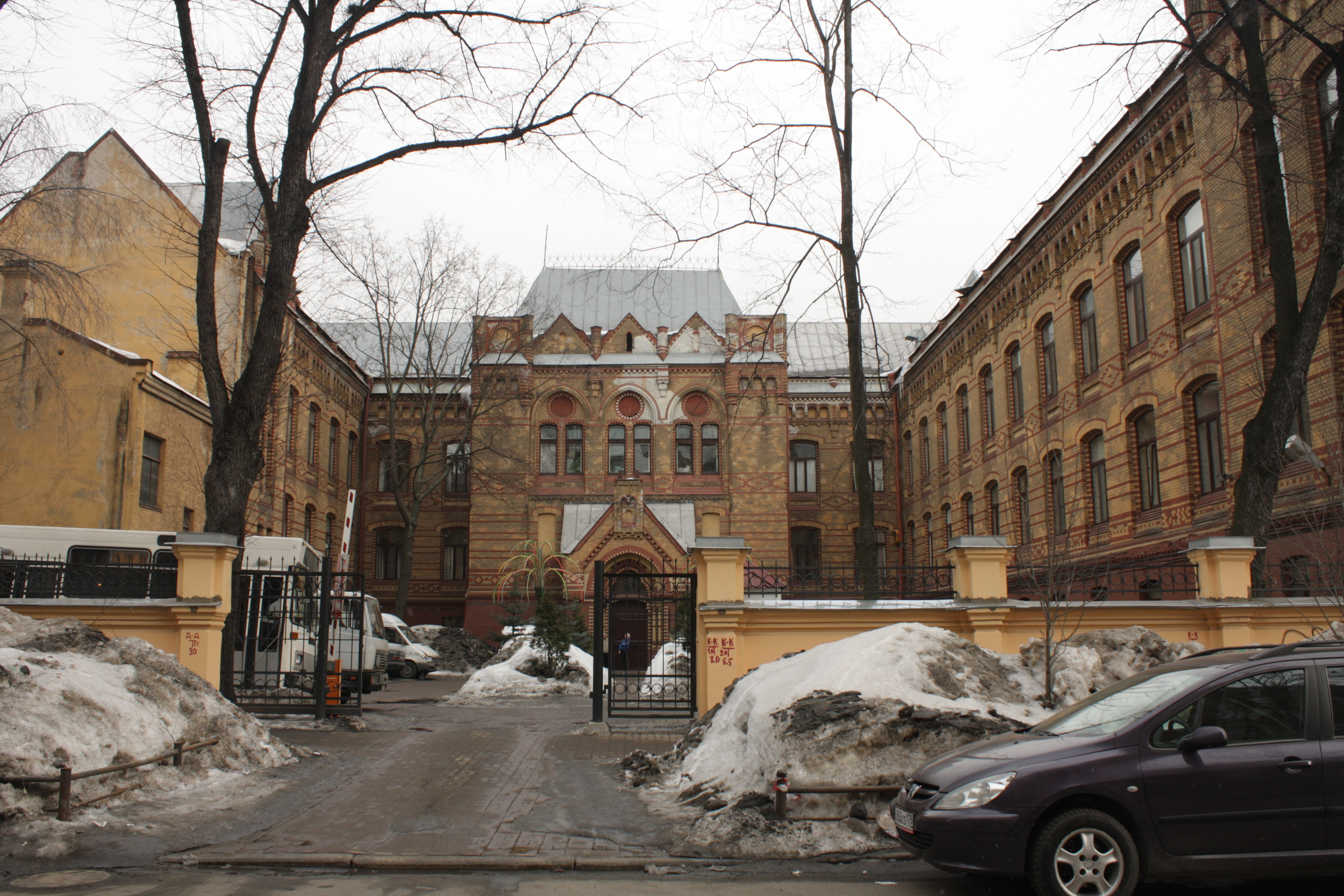
Alexandra asylum

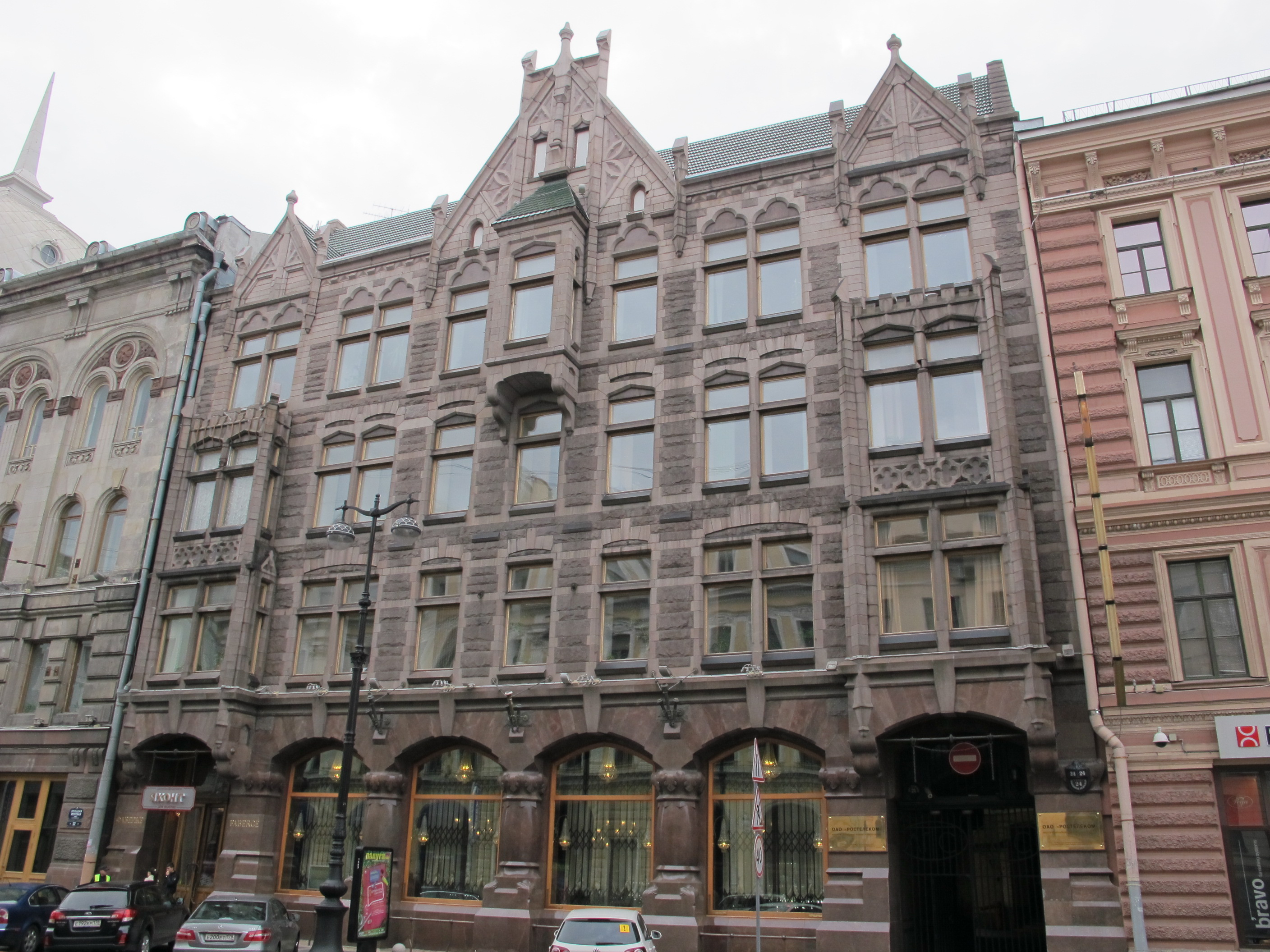
Building of the Fabergé firm

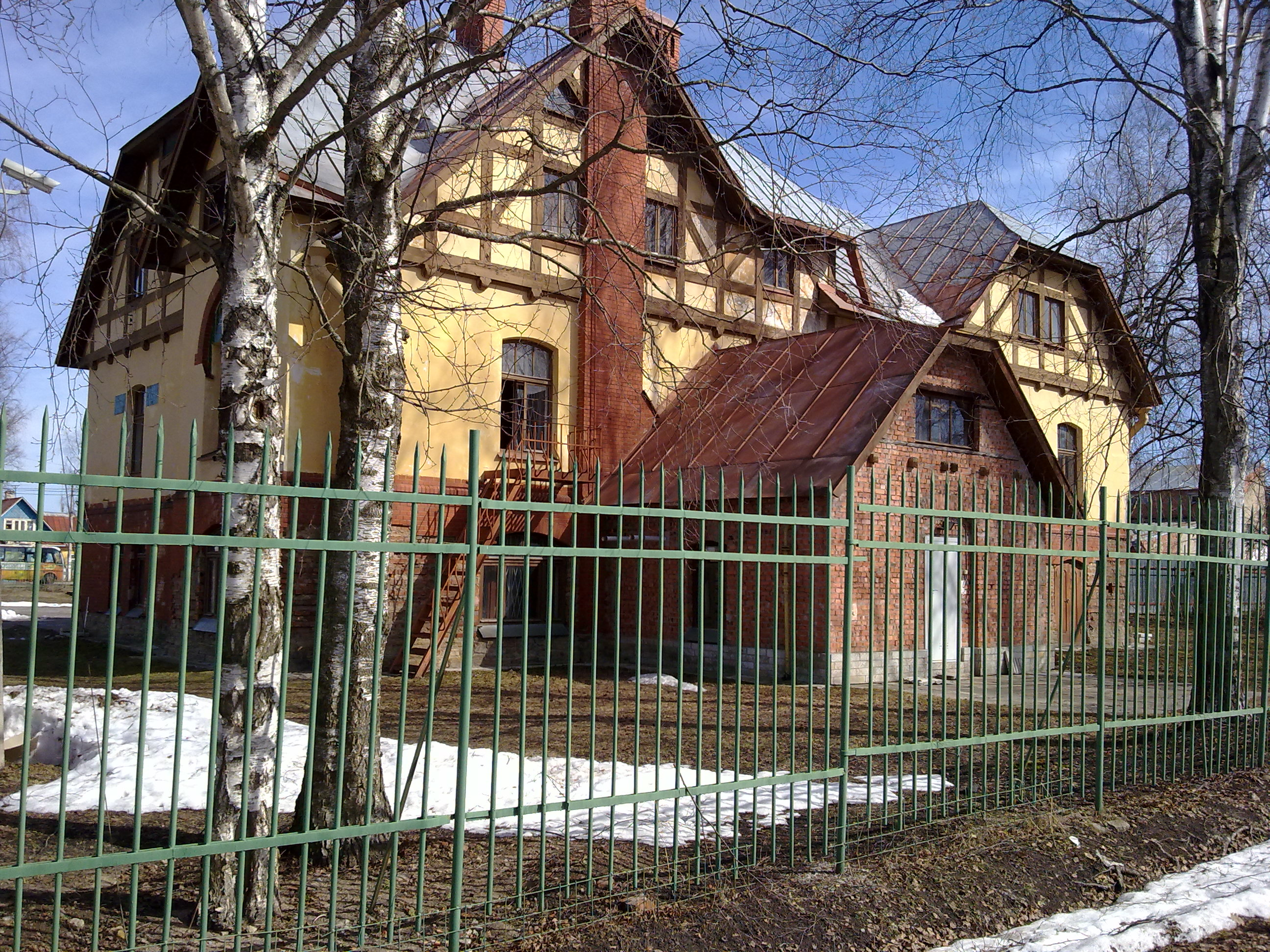
Carl Schmidt's villa in Pavlovsk
