= L. T. Rose-Hutchinson =

British philatelist

L. T. Rose-Hutchinson (died 1948) was a philatelist and postal historian. Rose-Hutchinson collected postage stamps for most of his life, joining the Royal Philatelic Society London in 1900 and the Postal History Society in 1940. During his Service career he spent most of his time in India, where he purchased collections and accumulations of stamps. Later he purchased most of the notable "Mackenzie-Grieve" collection.

== Collections ==
Rose-Hutchinson's collecting interests ranged over the postage stamps and postal history of India, India Used Abroad, and Hong Kong and Treaty Ports. The Scinde Dawks and the 1854 classic issues of India (both the lithographed and typographed) held special interest for him, while Hong Kong and the Treaty Ports formed a second major area of interest.

His collection included the essays of Thuiller; the 1854 lithographed issues in full sheets and large blocks; many rarities of Malacca, Penang, Singapore, Labuan and Sarawak; as well as Persian Field Force, Burmese Field Force and Abyssinian Field Force covers. The Two annas of 1854, in the rare Blue Green shade, appeared on a Persian Field Force cover of 1857.

== Tributes ==
Robson Lowe lauded Rose-Hutchinson's "discerning taste and exceptional knowledge about one of the most complex branches of philately."

== References and sources ==
Sources

- Robson Lowe, The "Rose-Hutchinson" Collection of India, 11–12 October 1949.
- Robson Lowe, The "Rose Hutchinson" Collection of Hong Kong and Treaty Ports, 2 November 1949.
- "Col. L. T. Rose-Hutchinson" The Philatelist and PJGB, 59 no. 1, January–March 1949 pp. 697–99.
