= Arthur Gray (Master of Jesus) =

English academic (1852–1940)

Arthur Gray (28 September 1852 –12 April 1940) was an English author, academic, Master of Jesus College, Cambridge from 1912 until his death.

Gray was educated at Blackheath Proprietary School and Jesus College, Cambridge. He was Fellow of Jesus from 1875 to 1885; Junior Proctor from 1885 to 1886; and Senior Tutor and Vice-Master from 1895 to 1912.

In 1917 he founded the Order of the Red Rose, an antisemitic group opposed to finance capitalism, with the zoologist George Percival Mudge, and the barrister William John Sanderson.

As a writer, Gray is primarily known for his Gothic ghost short stories collected in 1919 in Tedious Brief Tales of Granta and Gramarye, published under the pseudonym "Ingulphus". Gray also wrote several works exploring the life of Shakespeare, and he was also the author of local history works dedicated to Cambridge and the University of Cambridge.

Gray had six sons with his wife Alice Honora Gell (born 1857), whom he married in 1882. He was widowed in 1927 and died in the Master's Lodge in 1940 at the age of 87.

== Selected bibliography ==
Some of Gray's work:

- Shakespeare's Son-in-Law (1939)
- A Chapter in the Early Life of Shakespeare (1926)
- Cambridge and Its Story (1912; also known as Cambridge Described
- Cambridge
- Cambridge university, an episodical history
- How Shakespeare "purged" Jonson; a problem solved
- Jesus college
- Chapter in the early life of Shakespeare; Polesworth in Arden
- History of Jesus College, Cambridge
- Priory of Saint Radegund, Cambridge
- Town of Cambridge
- The earliest statutes of Jesus college, Cambridge, issued by James Stanley, Bishop of Ely, A. D. 1514-1515
