= Hudson, New Hampshire =

- Town
- Flag Seal

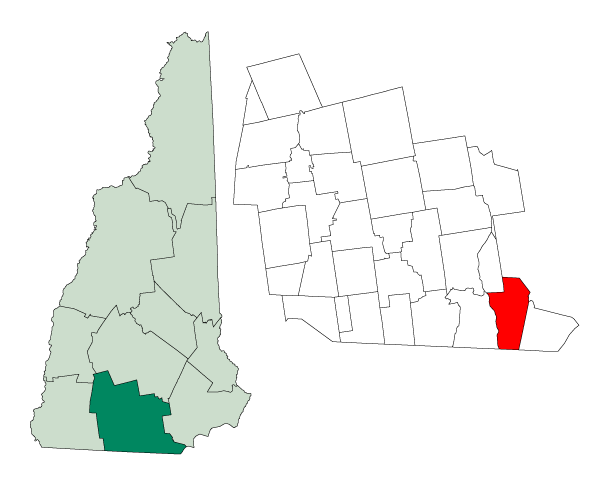
- Location within Hillsborough County, New Hampshire
- Coordinates: 42°45′25″N 71°23′26″W
- Country: United States
- State: New Hampshire
- County: Hillsborough
- Incorporated: 1673
- Annexed: 1731
- Incorporated: 1746 (renamed in 1830)
- Villages: Hudson; Hudson Center

Area
  - Total: 29.3 sq mi (75.8 km^{2})
  - Land: 28.3 sq mi (73.3 km^{2})
  - Water: 0.97 sq mi (2.5 km^{2})
- Elevation: 233 ft (71 m)

Population (2020)
  - Total: 25,394
  - Density: 898/sq mi (346.7/km^{2})
- Time zone: UTC-5 (EST)
  - Summer (DST): UTC-4 (EDT)
- ZIP code: 03051
- Area code: 603
- FIPS code: 33-37940
- GNIS feature ID: 873631
- Website: www.hudsonnh.gov

Hudson is a town in Hillsborough County, New Hampshire, United States. It is located along the Massachusetts state line. The population was 25,394 at the 2020 census. It is the tenth-largest municipality (town or city) in the state, by population.

The urban center of town, where 7,534 people resided as of the 2020 census, is defined as the Hudson census-designated place (CDP) and is located at the junctions of New Hampshire routes 102, 111 and 3A, directly across the Merrimack River from the city of Nashua.

== History ==
Hudson began as part of the Dunstable Land Grant that encompassed the current city of Nashua, New Hampshire, and the towns of Dunstable and Pepperell, Massachusetts, as well as parts of other nearby towns on both sides of the border. In 1732, all of Dunstable east of the Merrimack River became the town of Nottingham, Massachusetts. Nine years later, the northern boundary of Massachusetts was finally officially established, and the New Hampshire portion of Nottingham became Nottingham West, to avoid confusion with Nottingham, New Hampshire, to the northeast.

In 1830, after the better part of a century, the name was changed to "Hudson" to avoid confusion with the older town of Nottingham. The name apparently comes from an early belief that the Merrimack River had once been thought to be a tributary of the Hudson River, or that the area had once been explored by Henry Hudson; both proved to be entirely apocryphal stories, but the name of the town remains today.

A prominent family in Hudson history was the Alfred and Virginia Hills family, who owned a large tract of land north of Hudson Village. Dr. Hills' ancestors were original settlers of Hudson. The Hills House on Derry Road (now listed on the National Register of Historic Places) is the original family's vacation home and current location of the Hudson Historical Society. The grounds host the annual "Old Home Days" fair every year as well as "Harvest Fest" and the "Bronco Belly Bustin' Chili Fiesta", an Alvirne High School Friends of Music fundraiser. Hills Memorial Library (also listed on the National Register) is one of the oldest public lending libraries in the state, and occupies a stone and mortar building on Library Street.

Alvirne High School and the Alvirne Chapel, located on family land across Derry Road from the Hills House, were donated to the town. ("Alvirne" is a contraction of "Alfred" and "Virginia".) A strange rumor that the Hills' only son had died during a football game circled for many years, but Dr. and Mrs. Hills only had two daughters who did not survive infancy, so this was a made-up story. Out of respect, Alvirne High went many decades without a football team, despite being one of the largest high schools in the state. It was assumed that such a stipulation had been put as a condition of the high school's charter. When it was learned that no such condition had ever been recorded, financial pressures encouraged the formation of a football team. In fall of 1994, Alvirne High School fielded its first JV football team, with varsity play beginning in 1996. Alvirne High is home to one of the largest agricultural-vocational programs in the area, the Wilbur H. Palmer Agricultural and Vocational School. This school features several student-run businesses including a bank, restaurant, store, day care, dairy farm, and forestry program.

== Geography ==
Hudson is located in southeastern Hillsborough County along the southern edge of New Hampshire, with its southern boundary forming the Massachusetts state line. According to the United States Census Bureau, the town has a total area of 29.3 square miles (75.8 km^{2}), of which 28.3 square miles (73.3 km^{2}) are land and 0.97 square miles (2.5 km^{2}) are water, comprising 3.35% of the town.

The highest point in Hudson is Bush Hill, at 515 feet (157 m) above sea level, near the town's eastern border. Hudson lies fully within the Merrimack River watershed.

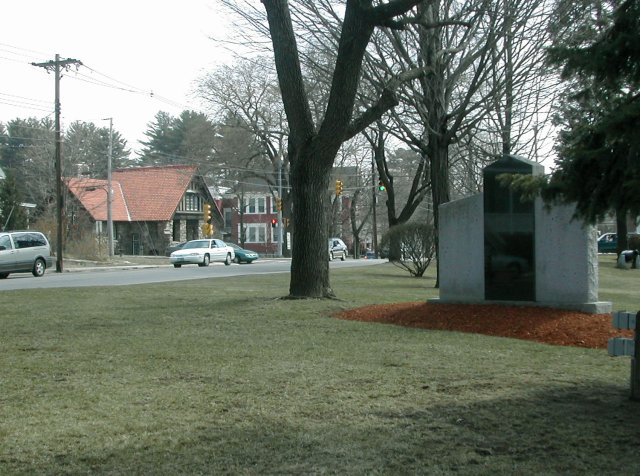
Hudson Town Common with Hills Memorial Library in background

The town of Hudson had two historic centers, though modern development and suburban sprawl have obscured the difference. Hudson Village, roughly equivalent to the Hudson census-designated place, is located at the western edge of town on the Merrimack River near the junctions of Routes 3A, 111, and 102, and was home to most of the original schools, libraries, and town government, though many of these functions have moved to new facilities elsewhere in town. The Town Hall still remains, though the main police station has moved to the eastern edge of town into an industrial park off Route 111. The Hills Memorial Library building remains as a historic landmark, though its collection has been moved to a new building, the Rodgers Memorial Library, located on Route 102 in the northeastern part of town. The historic Kimball Webster School no longer holds classes, but today houses the town superintendent's office, though both the Library Street School and the H.O. Smith School are still active. The Town Common at the intersection of Derry, Ferry, and Library streets is a park that displays large toy soldiers and other decorations at Christmas time.

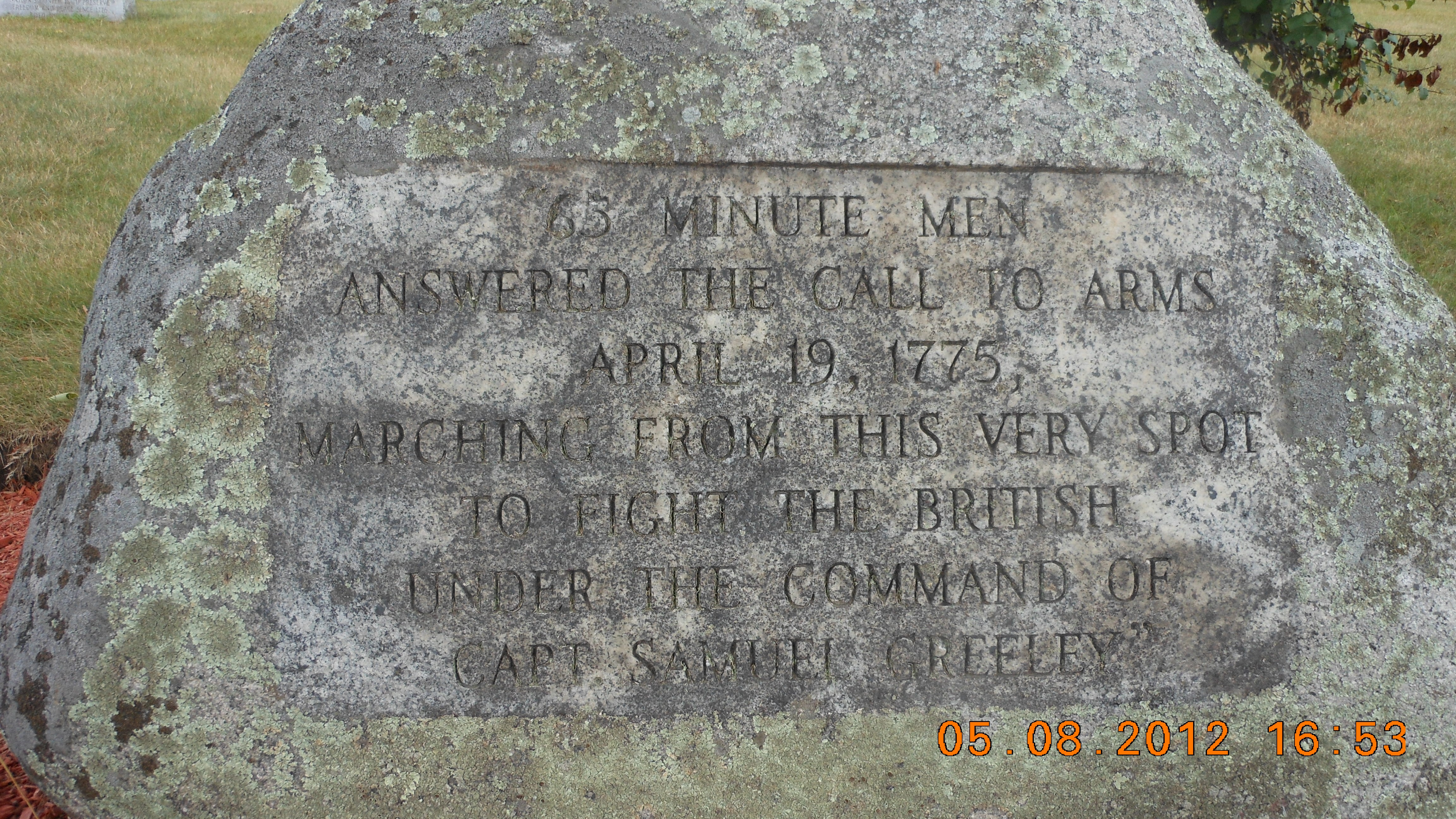
Revolutionary War monument to Samuel Greeley, for whom Greeley Street is named.

Hudson Center, historically Hudson's other town center, is located at the five-way intersection of Central Street (Route 111), Greeley Street, Kimball Hill Road, and Windham Road near the geographic center of the town. The two most important landmarks of Hudson Center have been lost to history. Benson's Wild Animal Farm, a zoo and amusement park, was closed in the late 1980s due to mounting financial losses. At one time there was a railway that passed through the Center, taking passengers all the way from the Boston area to Benson's. A rail depot stand remained on nearby Greeley Street through the 1970s. The acreage of Benson's Wild Animal Farm was purchased by the town and is now a park for passive recreation. Greeley Field, a popular park located in Hudson Center, contains a playground, Little League baseball diamond, and basketball courts, where pick-up games still occur frequently. A Revolutionary War-era cemetery and an old school house (now housing) on Kimball Hill Road are located nearby.

=== Climate ===
According to the Köppen Climate Classification system, Hudson has a warm-summer humid continental climate, abbreviated "Dfb" on climate maps.

Climate data for Hudson, New Hampshire, 1991–2020 normals, extremes 1985–present
Month	Jan	Feb	Mar	Apr	May	Jun	Jul	Aug	Sep	Oct	Nov	Dec	Year
Record high °F (°C)	70 (21)	75 (24)	86 (30)	94 (34)	95 (35)	98 (37)	102 (39)	99 (37)	95 (35)	85 (29)	79 (26)	74 (23)	102 (39)
Mean maximum °F (°C)	55.3 (12.9)	57.3 (14.1)	67.1 (19.5)	81.3 (27.4)	88.8 (31.6)	92.2 (33.4)	94.0 (34.4)	92.2 (33.4)	88.8 (31.6)	78.4 (25.8)	69.2 (20.7)	59.4 (15.2)	95.6 (35.3)
Mean daily maximum °F (°C)	33.5 (0.8)	36.5 (2.5)	44.7 (7.1)	57.9 (14.4)	68.9 (20.5)	77.7 (25.4)	83.4 (28.6)	81.8 (27.7)	74.2 (23.4)	61.3 (16.3)	49.3 (9.6)	38.9 (3.8)	59.0 (15.0)
Daily mean °F (°C)	23.2 (−4.9)	25.0 (−3.9)	33.8 (1.0)	46.0 (7.8)	57.3 (14.1)	66.7 (19.3)	72.3 (22.4)	70.5 (21.4)	62.5 (16.9)	49.7 (9.8)	38.8 (3.8)	29.3 (−1.5)	47.9 (8.9)
Mean daily minimum °F (°C)	12.9 (−10.6)	13.5 (−10.3)	22.9 (−5.1)	34.1 (1.2)	45.7 (7.6)	55.6 (13.1)	61.2 (16.2)	59.1 (15.1)	50.8 (10.4)	38.0 (3.3)	28.3 (−2.1)	19.7 (−6.8)	36.8 (2.7)
Mean minimum °F (°C)	−7.4 (−21.9)	−4.6 (−20.3)	3.5 (−15.8)	21.0 (−6.1)	30.3 (−0.9)	41.0 (5.0)	49.3 (9.6)	46.5 (8.1)	34.4 (1.3)	23.6 (−4.7)	13.4 (−10.3)	1.2 (−17.1)	−10.3 (−23.5)
Record low °F (°C)	−23 (−31)	−18 (−28)	−11 (−24)	14 (−10)	24 (−4)	33 (1)	43 (6)	37 (3)	26 (−3)	15 (−9)	−6 (−21)	−13 (−25)	−23 (−31)
Average precipitation inches (mm)	3.31 (84)	3.21 (82)	4.22 (107)	4.06 (103)	3.64 (92)	4.16 (106)	3.32 (84)	3.75 (95)	3.68 (93)	4.66 (118)	3.70 (94)	4.35 (110)	46.06 (1,168)
Average snowfall inches (cm)	17.1 (43)	16.3 (41)	14.6 (37)	2.8 (7.1)	0.0 (0.0)	0.0 (0.0)	0.0 (0.0)	0.0 (0.0)	0.0 (0.0)	0.6 (1.5)	2.0 (5.1)	13.4 (34)	66.8 (168.7)
Average precipitation days (≥ 0.01 in)	11.8	10.7	12.2	12.2	13.1	11.9	11.0	10.5	9.5	11.2	11.2	12.0	137.3
Average snowy days (≥ 0.1 in)	7.7	7.9	6.1	1.4	0.0	0.0	0.0	0.0	0.0	0.2	1.3	5.8	30.4
Source 1: NOAA
Source 2: National Weather Service

== Demographics ==
Historical population
Census	Pop.	Note	%±
1790	1,064		—
1800	1,267		19.1%
1810	1,376		8.6%
1820	1,227		−10.8%
1830	1,282		4.5%
1840	1,144		−10.8%
1850	1,312		14.7%
1860	1,222		−6.9%
1870	1,066		−12.8%
1880	1,045		−2.0%
1890	1,092		4.5%
1900	1,261		15.5%
1910	1,344		6.6%
1920	1,954		45.4%
1930	2,702		38.3%
1940	3,409		26.2%
1950	4,183		22.7%
1960	5,876		40.5%
1970	10,638		81.0%
1980	14,022		31.8%
1990	19,530		39.3%
2000	22,928		17.4%
2010	24,467		6.7%
2020	25,394		3.8%
2024 (est.)	25,787		1.5%
U.S. Decennial Census

As of the census of 2010, there were 24,467 people, 8,900 households, and 6,683 families residing in the town. The population density was 864 inhabitants per square mile (334/km^{2}). There were 9,212 housing units at an average density of 325.5 per square mile (125.7/km^{2}). The racial makeup of the town was 93.0% White, 1.4% Black or African American, 0.1% Native American, 3.0% Asian, 0.02% Pacific Islander, 0.9% some other race, and 1.6% from two or more races. Hispanic or Latino of any race were 2.9% of the population.

There were 8,900 households, out of which 38.5% had children under the age of 18 living with them, 60.0% were headed by married couples living together, 10.1% had a female householder with no husband present, and 24.9% were non-families. 18.9% of all households were made up of individuals, and 6.1% were someone living alone who was 65 years of age or older. The average household size was 2.73, and the average family size was 3.13.

In the town, the population was spread out, with 24.9% under the age of 18, 7.3% from 18 to 24, 27.5% from 25 to 44, 29.7% from 45 to 64, and 10.6% who were 65 years of age or older. The median age was 39.6 years. For every 100 females, there were 98.0 males. For every 100 females age 18 and over, there were 95.6 males.

For the period 2010–2012, the estimated median annual income for a household in the town was $83,640, and the median income for a family was $93,199. Male full-time workers had a median income of $62,038 versus $44,531 for females. The per capita income for the town was $34,462. About 3.4% of families and 4.6% of the population were below the poverty line, including 8.6% of those under age 18 and 11.2% of those age 65 or over.

== Education ==
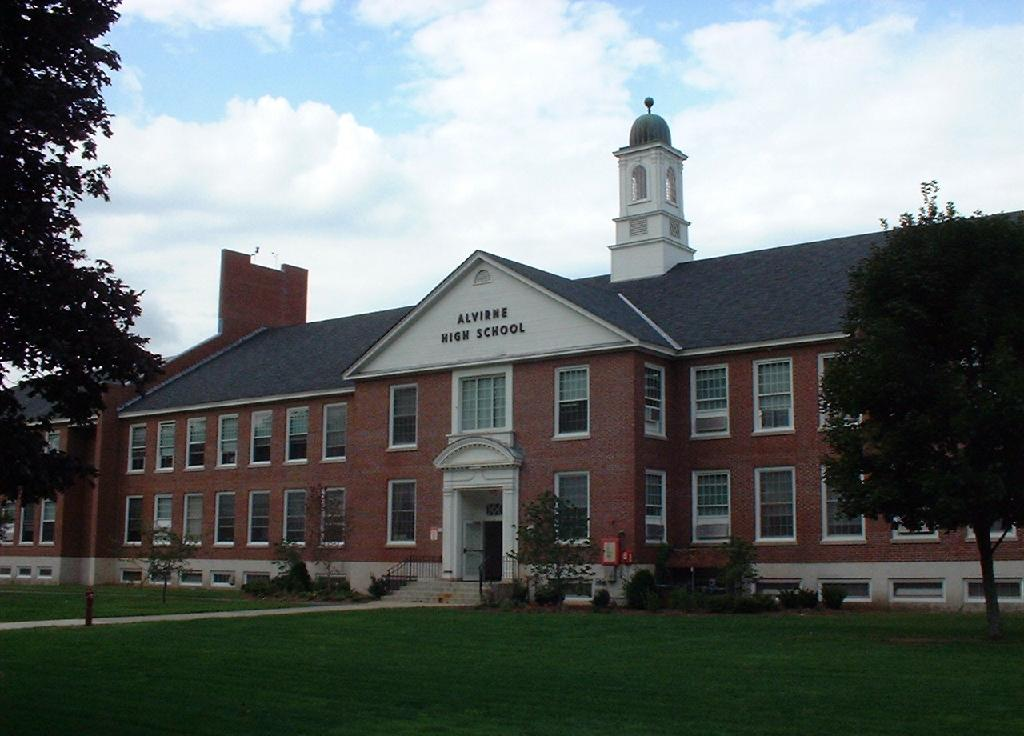
Alvirne High School

Hudson is the home of School Administrative Unit #81 of New Hampshire.

- High school (grades 9th–12th):
  - Alvirne High School, which is also home to the Wilbur H. Palmer Vocational-Technical Center, a business-oriented vocational school
- Middle school (grades 6th–8th):
  - Hudson Memorial School
- Elementary schools (grades K–5th):
  - Dr. H. O. Smith School (grade 1)
  - Library Street School (kindergarten)
  - Hills-Garrison School (grades 2–5)
  - Nottingham West Elementary School (grades 2–5)
- Private: Presentation of Mary Academy ("PMA" locally) is a Pre-K–8 coeducational Catholic school located on Lowell Road.

== Economy ==
Hudson serves primarily as a bedroom community for the Greater Boston metropolitan area, of which it is a part. In 2006, for example, there were an estimated 10,945 jobs in the public and private sector in Hudson, while the town's population was 24,729, with a civilian labor force of 14,818. The town's three largest employers are Benchmark Electronics, BAE Systems, and the Hudson School District. Presstek is also headquartered in Hudson.

== Transportation ==
Three New Hampshire state routes traverse the town:

- NH 3A is the main north-south route through town. It enters the town at the Massachusetts border following River Road. It then follows Lowell Road, Central Street, Chase Street, Derry Street, Elm Avenue, and Webster Street to the town's northern border with Litchfield. 3A shares a concurrency with NH 102 along Derry Street.
- NH 102 begins at the Taylor Falls/Veterans Memorial twin span bridge over the Merrimack River, and after a brief concurrency with NH 111, joins NH 3A for a concurrency along Derry Street. After 3A leaves Derry Street, 102 continues along it to the northeast passing through a small portion of Litchfield, then returning into Hudson briefly before crossing into Londonderry.
- NH 111 enters the town at the Taylor Falls/Veterans Memorial bridge from Nashua and has a brief concurrency with NH 102. 111 follows Ferry Street, Burnham Road, and Central Street as the main east-west route across town. It leaves at the town's eastern edge entering the town of Windham.

In addition to the three numbered state highways, about half of a two-mile section of the as-yet uncompleted Circumferential Highway also exists in Hudson. The road currently serves to connect Hudson to the Everett Turnpike in Nashua, using the Sagamore Bridge across the Merrimack River.

The nearest airports are Boire Field in Nashua and Manchester–Boston Regional Airport along the border of Londonderry and Manchester. The nearest rail service is the Lowell Line of the MBTA Commuter Rail which can be accessed at the Charles A. Gallagher Transit Terminal in Lowell, Massachusetts. The nearest Amtrak stations are Boston's North Station or South Station. The nearest intercity bus depot is at the Nashua Transit Center in Nashua. Hudson currently has no public transportation in the town; though a street trolley formerly ran through the town connecting it to neighboring communities.

== Notable people ==
- Lionel R. Boucher (1931–2019) – member of the New Hampshire House of Representatives

== Sites of interest ==
Two small recreational lakes exist within the town borders. Robinson (or Robinson's) Pond in the northern part of the town features a public access beach and boat ramp that can be accessed via Robinson Road. Otternic Pond (locally called "Tonic Pond"), located between Hudson Center and Hudson Village, has a public boat landing (Claveau Landing) that can be accessed off Highland Street. Both ponds are often used for fishing during the summer and skating and ice hockey during the winter. Musquash Pond (or Swamp), located in the southern part of the town, is a wild bird sanctuary and is utilized as a breeding ground by several threatened and endangered species of birds. In the early 1900s hunters would travel by horse from as far as Derry to camp and stalk game in the renowned swamp.

Benson's Wild Animal Farm reopened in May 2010 as Benson Park, a town park for recreational use. The park includes trails for walking, biking and hiking, several ponds, wildlife blinds, picnic areas, a children's playground, dog parks and a park store. There is no admission fee. Much work has been done and is ongoing to rehabilitate and maintain the park's trails, gardens, landscaping, and remaining buildings. The Old Lady in the Shoe, the gorilla house, the elephant barn, the A-Frame roof and other structures including the train stop building have been repaired. Cage concerts are held in the elephant barn cage. An official grand opening and re-dedication was held September 2010. The park is home to the largest 9/11 memorial in the state.

Hills Memorial Library, located in Hudson Village, was one of the oldest public lending libraries in the state before its closing in 2009, and is listed on the National Register of Historic Places. While no longer open to the public, the building remains a prominent landmark in Hudson Village.

One public golf course is in Hudson, the Whip-Poor-Will Golf Club off Route 102.

A 1/4-mile paved racetrack, the Hudson Speedway, lies near the northern edge of town by the intersection of Old Derry Road and Robinson Road. It can be accessed off Route 102. It hosts races from the NASCAR Advance Auto Parts Weekly Series.
