= Alvirne High School =

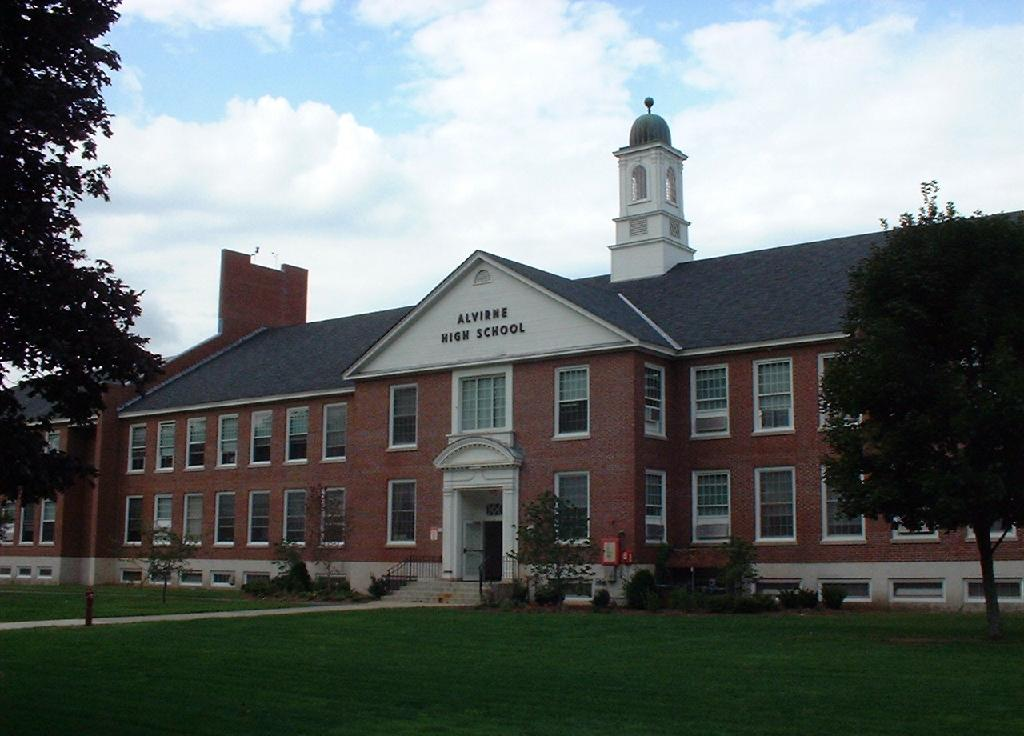

Location
- 200 Derry Rd; Hudson, New Hampshire 03051; United States
- Coordinates: 42°47′35″N 71°26′17″W

Information
- School type: Public High School
- Motto: "Character, Community, Curiosity, Commitment"
- School district: Hudson School District
- Superintendent: Daniel Moulis
- CEEB code: 300280
- Principal: Steve Beals
- Staff: 80.00 (FTE)
- Grades: 9–12
- Enrollment: 1,060 (2022-2023)
- Student to teacher ratio: 13.25
- Language: English
- Colors: Maroon and Gold
- Athletics conference: NHIAA; Division I
- Mascot: Broncos
- Rivals: Londonderry High School
- Accreditation: NEASC
- Feeder schools: Hudson Memorial School
- Website: ahs.sau81.org
- Last updated: October 12, 2023

Alvirne High School is located in the town of Hudson, New Hampshire, United States, with an enrollment of approximately 1,000 students from grades 9–12. In addition to its core curriculum, Alvirne High School offers technical programs through the on-campus Wilbur H. Palmer Career & Technical Education Center (Palmer Center), a career and technical education school. Students attending the Palmer Center take core academic classes at Alvirne High School or another local high school.

Alvirne gets its name from a prominent Hudson family, the Alfred and Virginia Hills family, who left a large piece of property to the town in the early 20th century to provide land for the building of a high school. A portmanteau of their names (Alfred and Virginia) provides the name for the school. The school mascot is the bronco, and the school colors are maroon and gold.

== History ==
=== Beginnings ===
In the early 1920s, Alfred K. Hills wanted to establish a high school in his hometown of Hudson, New Hampshire. Alfred K. Hills, along with his mother-in-law Mary F. Creutzborg, donated land from the Hills estate and $350,000 for the high school's construction. Several decades later, construction of the main building began in October 1949. Designed by Irving W. Hersey Associates, the main building opened as a combined junior and senior high school in September 1950. Three-hundred and eight students attended Alvirne during the inaugural 1950–1951 school year. In June 1951, the first class of 25 seniors graduated from the new school.

In its first few years, a committee of community farmers advised the school on operating its farm. This committee advocated for a switch to dairy farming. By 1957, Alvirne High School became an agricultural school.

=== Growth ===
In 1958, voters authorized an addition of eight rooms and a cafeteria to the main building. A separate vocational and agricultural building was built as well.

In 1964, voters authorized a second addition, adding sixteen rooms to the north end of the main building. At the same meeting, it was decided to accept students from Pelham.

As the student population increased, the school became overcrowded. Then-Principal Chester Steckevicz developed a quarterly program that allowed the school to be open year-round, alleviating the overcrowding. The system was implemented in the 1970–1971 school year.

=== Fire and reconstruction ===
On September 8, 1974, two days after the start of the school year, a large fire gutted the building. More than 80% of the building was destroyed, requiring most of it to be rebuilt. After an investigation by the Hudson Fire Department, it was determined that the fire was the result of arson. The destruction of the school resulted in the displacement of more than a thousand students from Hudson and surrounding towns.

While reconstruction efforts were underway, students in grades 4 and 5 attended the previously vacant St. Francis Xavier school building in Nashua, New Hampshire. Students in grades 7-12 attended Hudson Memorial School in alternating sections. In November, two months after the fire, the school district voted at a special meeting to rebuild Alvirne for $4.3 million. The cost of rebuilding the school was split between insurance money, the Alvirne Board of Trustees, and a municipal bond for $2 million. The rebuilt school opened a year later on September 9, 1975, in the exact location of the previous school.

=== Technical Center renovation and addition ===
In 2021, the Hudson School District completed renovations and additions to the Wilbur H. Palmer Career & Technical Education Center. Each career and technical program had its space redesigned and retrofitted with new equipment. The program spaces were built with room for change in the future.

== Campus ==
The main Alvirne building is built parallel to New Hampshire Route 111. It consists of three floors. A rear wing houses the cafeteria on the first floor and a gymnatorium on the second and third floors. The original main entrance of the high school is no longer in use as it is neither ADA compliant nor secure. Instead, the entrance to the Steckevicz Gym is utilized. This entrance was identified by the Hudson School District as a security risk because the entrance opens directly into the school's cafeteria and administrative offices are not located near the entrance. Visitors walk through the school building to get to the main office.

The Wilbur H. Palmer Career & Technical Education is connected to the main Alvirne building by a corridor. After the 2021 renovation, a new main entrance to the CTE wing was constructed closer to the front of the school to increase safety and accessibility.

Next to the CTE wing, the Alvirne Farm produces dairy for Cabot Creamery and the school's culinary arts program.

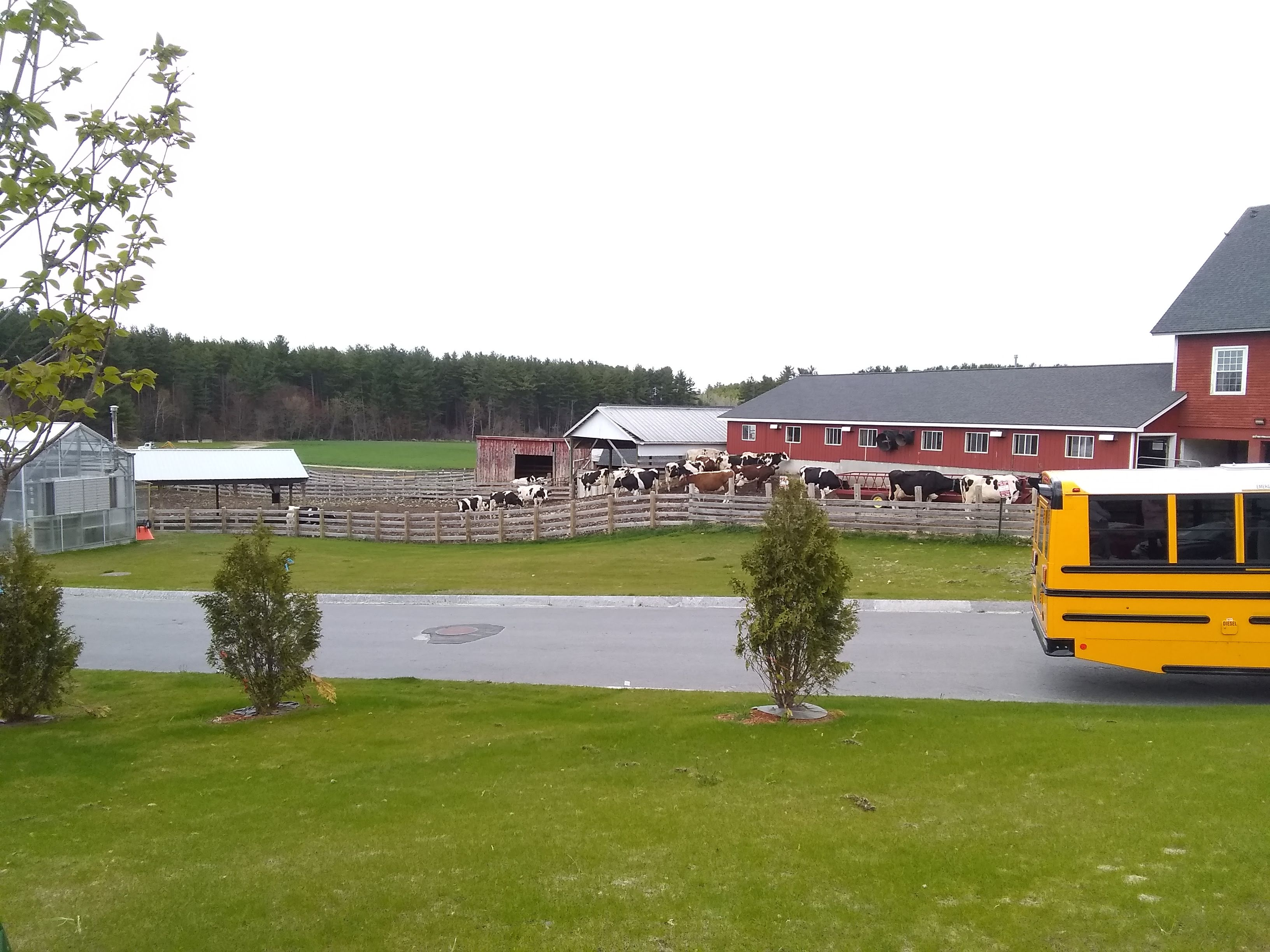
The Alvirne Farm

The Alvirne Tree Farm is across from the main school building and Alvirne Farm. The Wilbur H. Palmer Career & Technical Education (CTE) Center natural resources program uses the Alvirne Tree Farm for classes. Several trails are utilized by the public for hiking, running, and cross-country skiing. The Hills House, the former summer home of Alfred K. Hills and Virginia Hills, is part of the Alvirne High School campus despite being on the opposite side of New Hampshire Route 111. The building itself is home to the Hudson Historical Society and is on the National Register of Historic Places. Although the Hills House is not used for daily school operations, the surrounding fields are used by the school for cross country events such as the annual Battle for the Border Invitational.

== Academics ==
All students are required to complete a capstone seminar class to graduate. In addition to Spanish and French, Alvirne High School's Foreign Language department offers Russian and American Sign Language. As of 2023, eleven Advanced Placement courses are available for students to take such as AP Government, AP Calculus, and AP Biology. Each academic department offers electives in addition to core classes. For example, the Social Studies Department offers a Model United Nations elective that includes simulations and debates on current events around the world.

Several courses are eligible for dual enrollment credit through Southern New Hampshire University.

The Alvirne High School Music Department hosts an annual Cabaret show that includes various performances by instrumentalists and vocalists.

=== Wilbur H. Palmer Career & Technical Education Center ===
Beginning in sophomore year, students are able to enroll in vocational programs such as culinary arts, digital media, and veterinary science in addition to their core academic classes. Several programs operate businesses open to the public. These include the Barnyard Cafe, Blooming Broncos Greenhouse & Flower Shop, and the Alvirne Agri-Pet Kennel.

== Extra curriculars ==
Alvirne High School clubs are led by faculty advisors. Clubs span both Alvirne High School and the Wilbur H. Palmer Career & Technical Education Center. For example, the Calf Club assists the Alvirne Farm with caring for the cows and hosts events like Open Farm day. A

Alvirne Class Act Thespians perform several productions per year including musicals and straight plays. Every year, students across all four years participate in Video Night, a variety show where each grade competes against one another by performing a themed skit.

In addition to clubs, several national honors societies exist at Alvirne High School. The Spanish National Honors Society and the National Honors Society community service projects and host events for the general public. Traditionally, the National Honors Society assists the Hudson Food Pantry with the Feed Our Kids program. Through this program, members of the Honors Society pack bags of food for students K-12 in the Hudson School District.

=== Athletics ===
Alvirne High School is a Division I school in the New Hampshire Interscholastic Athletic Association. Athletic programs are offered year round and include sports such as baseball, basketball, swim, and cheer. The Hills House property and Alvirne Tree Farm are used as a cross country course. The NHIAA uses this course for the cross country Meet of Champions.

== Administration ==
=== School district ===
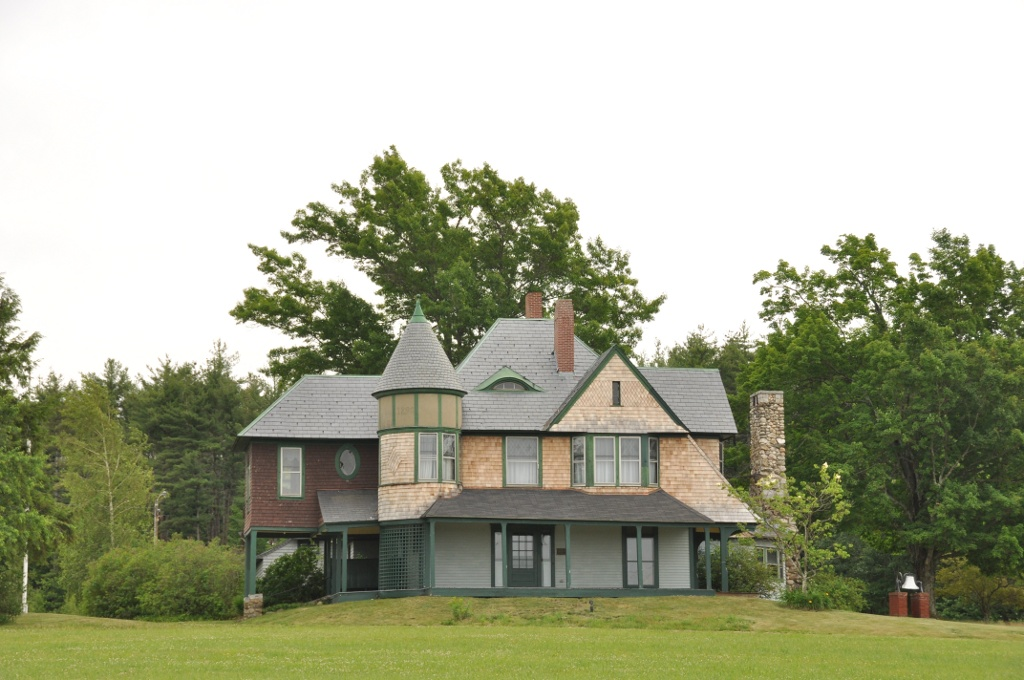
The Hills House

Alvirne High School is the only high school in the Hudson School District, under the authority of School Administrative Unit # 81 of New Hampshire (SAU81). The system is under the direction of the Hudson School Board, consisting of five elected members.

== Awards and recognitions ==
- Christian Cheetham, New Hampshire Teacher of the Year
- Special Olympics Unified Champion School

== Notable alumni ==
- Jason Brennan, philosopher and author, Robert J. and Elizabeth Flanagan Family Professor at Georgetown University.
- Derek Griffith, late model racing driver
- Shawn Jasper, former speaker of the New Hampshire House of Representatives
- Ryan S. Phaneuf, U.S. Air Force pilot
- Hollis Robbins, scholar and academic leader, currently Dean at University of Utah.
- Christian Urrutia, former Special Counsel at the Pentagon and 2026 Congressional candidate
