= George Higlett =

Chartered Secretary and philatelist

- Born: George Allen Higlett; 1860
- Died: 1940 (aged 79–80)

George Allen Higlett (1860–1940) was a Chartered Secretary and philatelist who was also a prolific philatelic author and won a gold medal for his display of Turkish stamps at the London International Stamp Exhibition in 1923.

Amongst Higlett's works were the humorous Higlett Booklets. Higlett also published under the pen name of Hig and G.A.H.

George Higlett was appointed to the Roll of Distinguished Philatelists in 1925.

== Selected publications ==
- Turkey - Random Notes.
- Wonders of Navigation.
- A Colonial Venus. (Portugal 25c SG878 stamp)
- Olympic Football. (1924 Olympic Games)
- Still Talking. (Costa Rica 10c SG176 stamp)
- The Catamaran. (Fiji SG249, 251 & 257 stamps)
- The Envious Cockroach. (Spain 15c SG781 stamp)
- The Giraffe's Diet. (Nyassa Company 25c SG32 stamp)
- On collecting War Stamps, Perth, 1920.
- Gems from Jamaica, 1921. (Higlett Booklet No.5)
- Colombia: The 1918 issue of 3 centavos: the twenty types., circa 1923.
- Some Swedish philatelic portraits, Perth, 1924.
- Dutch Philatelic Art, Perth, 1925.
- Philatelic tutti-frutti (being satires on designs of postage stamps), Perth, 1928.
