= Henry G. Lapham =

Henry G. Lapham was an American investment banker, oilman, philatelist, philanthropist, and sportsman. He was the founding president of the Boston Garden-Arena Corporation and a major sports promoter in Boston during the 1920s and 1930s.

== Early life ==
Lapham was born in 1875 in Brooklyn to John Jesse and Mary Elizabeth Walker Lapham. His father was a leather merchant and tanner who merged several companies to create the Central Leather Co. of Pennsylvania, which eventually became part of the United States Leather Company. The family relocated to Boston, and they continued to financially prosper due to involvement with the American-Hawaiian Steamship Company and ownership in Texas and California oil fields.

Lapham graduated from Yale University in 1897 and a year later moved to Boston. Lapham married to Rebecca Lounsberry, a fellow native of Brooklyn, shortly after graduating from college. They had two children, Raymond and Kathryn.

== Business career ==
Lapham's first position was as a clerk in the offices of the United States Leather Company. He later branched out into banking and brokerage and was involved in a number of businesses, including B. A. Corbin & Sons Co. (as treasurer), Eastern Massachusetts Street Railway Company, the National Rockland Bank, Franklin Shoe Company, and the Boston National League baseball club (as director). He was also a director of the Texas Company, which was founded by family member Lewis Henry Lapham. He resigned from the board in 1933.

== Sports ==
=== BAA ===
Lapham joined the Boston Athletic Association in 1914. He was the BAA's vice president from 1918 to 1920. Lapham then served as president from 1920 to 1926, when he chose not to continue in that role due to business pressures. He was succeeded by George W. Wightman, husband of Hazel Hotchkiss Wightman.

=== Boston Arena and Boston Garden ===
Lapham played an instrumental role in the construction of the Boston Arena. In the late 1920s the arena received competition from the newly constructed Boston Garden, which was owned by the Boston & Maine Railroad and run by the Madison Square Garden Corporation. The Boston Garden was unable to make a profit and in 1934 the smaller Boston Arena Corporation, led by Lapham, purchased a controlling interest in the Boston Garden. In 1936, Lapham's group bought out the remaining stock owned by the Madison Square Garden Corporation. Under the management of Lapham and general manager George V. Brown, the Garden was able to become a prosperous venture.

=== Other ===
In 1920, Lapham was elected president of the National Association of Amateur Billiard Players.

In 1924 he was elected first vice chairman of the American Olympic Association. He became president of the Olympic Committee following the death of president William C. Prout. He resigned from the committee in 1927, citing the stress of his business interests. He was succeeded by Douglas MacArthur.

In 1924, Lapham donated $350,000 for the construction of an athletic clubhouse on the Yale campus, which was named the Lapham Field House.

== Philately ==
Lapham was known for his collection of United States postmasters provisional stamps. He received a gold medal at the 1926 New York International Philatelic Exhibition for his collection of New York Postmaster's Provisionals, which included more than 700 of the stamps, including six with the rare "RHM" initials, and a complete plate assembled from forty of the stamps. In 1930, his collection of Spanish stamps was chosen as the best show as the American Philatelic Society's annual banquet He won a Grand Award at the 1936 Third International Philatelic Exhibition for his collection of U.S. Postmasters' Provisionals. Charles J. Phillips was quoted as saying that, "after the death of Arthur Hind, Henry Lapham ranked as the third greatest stamp collector in the United States."

== Threats ==
In 1924, Salvatore Schiavone, a resident of Boston's North End, was arrested for sending a letter in which he threatened to kill to Lapham if he did not pay him $5,000. Schiavone sent a second letter in 1932, this time asking for $10,800. Schiavone admitted to sending the second letter, stating he felt that Lapham owed him the money as he had been imprisoned unfairly.

In 1934, Lapham's daughter-in-law received police protection after she received a phone call that police interpreted as a threat to kidnap her.

== Death ==
Lapham died on December 16, 1939, at his home at 514 Warren Street Chestnut Hill, Massachusetts, following two years of poor health. His wife died in April 1940, less than four months after Lapham's death.
