= Arthur Gray (philatelist) =

Australian philatelist

- Arthur Gray in 2007
- Born: Arthur William Sinclair Gray; 14 April 1939
- Died: 22 May 2015 (aged 76)
- Occupation: Banker
- Known for: Collection of Australian stamps

Arthur William Sinclair Gray FRPS (14 April 1939 – 22 May 2015) was an Australian philatelist known for his collection of pre-decimal Australian stamps, particularly the "kangaroo and map" issues. A collector from a young age, a successful business career gave him the means to build a gold medal winning collection through determined auction bidding in which he hated to be unsuccessful. He was active in organised philately being a fellow of several philatelic societies and was a leading figure in the purchase of the Brusden-White philatelic business. The sale of his kangaroo and map stamps at auction in 2007 was a complete sell-out and achieved a world record price for a single Australian stamp.

== Early life ==
Arthur Gray was born on 14 April 1939. He was a stamp collector from a young age and would ride to local post offices on his bicycle to buy imprint blocks of the current stamps.

== Career ==
Gray worked as a lawyer for BHP and then as a merchant banker before starting a chain of health food stores in Sydney. An early retirement allowed him to concentrate on philately.

== Philately ==
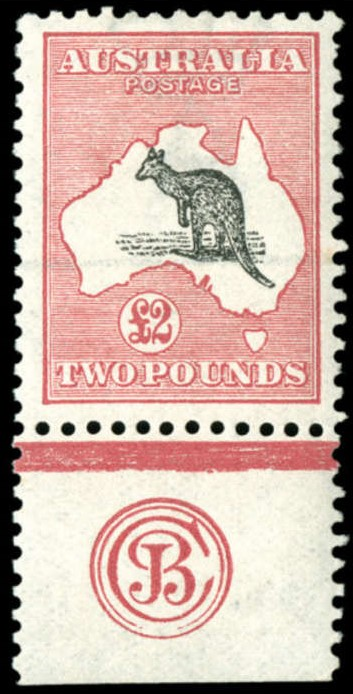
The record-breaking 1913 £2 kangaroo and map stamp with lower sheet selvedge with JBC monogram. Formerly in the Arthur Gray collection.

Gray, whose nickname among his philatelic friends was "nugget", was known for his collection of pre-decimal Australian stamps, particularly the "kangaroo and map" issues. He had a leading collection of Australian booklet stamps and his collection of King George V Australian stamps was described by auctioneer Gary Watson in The Sydney Morning Herald as "better than what's in the Queen's Royal Collection". He was a ferocious competitor for his chosen material, with the money from his former career to pay for his bids, and prided himself on never being outbid at an auction except at great cost to his competitors. The resulting collections won 11 gold medals and 22 large gold medals at international philatelic exhibitions.

Gray was a fellow of the Royal Philatelic Society London before the members of which he gave consecutive displays of 1,200 pages. He was also a fellow of the Royal Philatelic Society of Victoria and twice president of the Australian Commonwealth Collectors' Club of New South Wales. He was the fourth person to be made an honorary fellow of the Australian Philatelic Order. He was also a key member of the group who bought the Brusden-White specialist catalogue of Australian stamps and auction business.

When his collection of "Roos", as the kangaroo and map stamps are colloquially known, was sold at auction in New York in 2007, it grossed $US 5,584,000 (including the 15% buyer's premium) with all 849 lots sold. Gray's 1913 £2 black and red kangaroo and map stamp with lower sheet selvedge with JBC monogram reached a world record price for a single Australian stamp of $US 138,000 despite being hinged, and having a crease and some toned perforations. One dealer observed that with an estimated value without the selvedge of only around $US 4,500, the buyer had paid $US 133,500 just for the monogrammed slip of paper attached to the stamp. Gray had expressed the wish that the collection be dispersed on the open market in order to allow new collections to be formed, rather than be sold to an institution as that of fellow Australian collector Ray Chapman's had.

== Death and legacy ==
Gray died on 22 May 2015 after suffering from a prolonged period of ill-health.
