= Pierre Langlois (philatelist) =

French philatelist (1909–1990)

- Born: 1909
- Died: 1990 (aged 80–81)
- Occupation: philatelist

Pierre Langlois (1909–1990) was a French philatelist who joined the Roll of Distinguished Philatelists in 1967.

Langlois was a chemist by profession.
