= List of philatelic awards =

This list of philatelic awards is an index to articles describing notable awards for philately. The list shows the country of the sponsor(s) of each award, but recipients are not necessarily limited to people from that country.

Country	Award	Sponsor	Description
United States	American Philatelic Society Hall of Fame	American Philatelic Society	Deceased philatelists who have made significant contributions during their lifetime to the field of philately
United Kingdom	Congress Medal	Philatelic Congress of Great Britain	In recognition of dedication to the hobby over many years
United Kingdom	Crawford Medal	Royal Philatelic Society London	Most valuable and original contribution to the study and knowledge of philately published in book form
United States	Distinguished Philatelist Award	U.S. Philatelic Classics Society	Exceptionally meritorious service to U.S. Philately through published research, award-winning collections, active participation in the organization & promotion of philatelic exhibitions, & sustained administrative service to the national or international organizations which furthered United States philately
United States	Distinguished Topical Philatelist	American Topical Association	Award for service to topical philately in general and to the American Topical Association
Germany	Glasewald Medal	A. E. Glasewald	Meritorious research into the history of the German private posts
Germany	Kalckhoff Medal	Bund Deutscher Philatelisten	Special services in the field of German-language philatelic literature.
United States	Lichtenstein Medal	Collectors Club of New York	Living individual for outstanding service to philately
Germany	Lindenberg Medal	Berlin Philatelic Club	Conspicuous service to philately because of investigations and contributions to philatelic literature
United States	Luff Award	American Philatelic Society	Meritorious contributions to philately by living philatelists
United Kingdom	Phillips Gold Medal		Person who has contributed the most to British postage stamp design in recent years
United Kingdom	Roll of Distinguished Philatelists	Philatelic Congress of Great Britain	Those who have assisted the development of philately through their research, expertise or giving their time
South Africa	Roll of Distinguished Philatelists of Southern Africa	Philatelic Federation of South Africa	Those who have assisted the development of philately through their research, expertise or giving their time
United Kingdom	Rowland Hill Awards	Royal Mail, British Philatelic Trust, Association of British Philatelic Societies	Encourage and reward fresh ideas which help promote Philately
United States	Smithsonian Philatelic Achievement Award	National Postal Museum	Outstanding lifetime accomplishments in the field of philately

== See also ==
- Lists of awards
