= Lichtenstein Medal =

Award given for outstanding service in Philately

The Lichtenstein Medal, also known as the Alfred F. Lichtenstein Memorial Award for Distinguished Service to Philately is given annually to a living individual for outstanding service to philately.

== Origin ==
The Lichtenstein Medal was established by the Collectors Club of New York in 1952 in honor of noted philatelist Alfred F. Lichtenstein (1876–1947).

The Lichtenstein Medal is similar in importance in philately with the Lindenberg Medal awarded by the Berliner Philatelisten-Klub of Germany for investigations and contributions to philatelic literature.

== Recipients ==
Philatelic experts who received the Lichtenstein Medal include:

- Theodore E. Steinway (1952)
- Dr. Clarence W. Hennan (1953)
- Dr. Carroll Chase (1954)
- August Dietz (1955)
- John Wilson (1956)
- Harry L. Lindquist (1957)
- Winthrop Smillie Boggs (1958)
- Gen. Cornelius Wendell Wickersham (1959)
- J. R. W. Purves (1960)
- John J. Britt (1961)
- Louise Boyd Dale (1962)
- Henry M. Goodkind (1963)
- Vincent Graves Greene (1964)
- Alvaro Bonilla Lara (1965)
- Harrison D. S. Haverbeck (1966)
- John R. Boker, Jr. (1967)
- Herbert J. Bloch (1968)
- H. R. Holmes (1969)
- Robson Lowe (1970)
- Mortimer L. Neinken (1971)
- Soichi Ichida (1972)
- Philip Silver (1973)
- Ernest Anthony Kehr (1974)
- Joseph Schatzkés (1975)
- George Townsend Turner (1976)
- F. Burton Sellers (1977)
- Col. James T. DeVoss (1978)

- Dr. Enzo Diena (1979)
- Ronald A. G. Lee (1980)
- Barbara R. Mueller (1981)
- Robert Granville Stone (1982)
- George Wendell Brett (1983)
- Robert H. Pratt (1984)
- William Herbert Miller, Jr. (1985)
- George South (1986)
- Bernard A. Hennig (1987)
- Sir John Marriott (1988)
- Susan Marshall McDonald (1989)
- John O. Griffiths (1990)
- Hiroyuki Kanai (1991)
- Dr. Roberto M. Rosende (1992)
- Robert P. Odenweller (1993)
- Alan K. Huggins (1994)
- Louis Grunin (1995)
- Paul Hilmar Jenson (1996)
- Dr. Norman S. Hubbard (1997)
- Gary S. Ryan (1998)
- Gordon C. Morison (1999)
- Thomas C. Mazza (2001)
- Harry Sutherland (2002)
- Richard F. Winter (2003)
- Ernst Max Cohn(2004)

- John M. Hotchner (2005)
- Patricia Stilwell Walker (2006)
- Thomas J. Alexander (2007)
- Charles J. Peterson (2008)
- Harlan F. Stone II (2009)
- Peter P. McCann (2010)
- William H. Gross (2011)
- Francis Kiddle (2012)
- Alan Warren (2013)
- Roger Brody (2014)
- Wade E. Saadi (2015)
- Dr. Cheryl Ganz (2016)
- Stephen Reinhard (2017)
- George Kramer (2018)
- Christopher M.B. King (2019)
- John H. Barwis (2020)
- Dr. Mark Banchik (2021)
- Patrick Maselis (2021)
- Christopher Harman (2022)
- Trish Kaufmann (2023)
- Randy Neil (2023)
- Charles J.G. Verge (2023)
- Jim Mazepa (2024)
- Yamil H. Kouri, Jr. (2025)

== See also ==
- Philately
- Philatelic literature
- List of philatelic awards

== References and sources ==
Sources

- Alfred Lichtenstein bio
- APS Hall of Fame 1948 - Lichtenstein
- Most expensive stamp collection Guinness World Records
