= Benjamin Wishnietsky =

- Benjamin Wishnietsky, standing third from the right at the Hollywood (Florida) Stamp Club. Bottom row, left to right: Edith York, Uhle York, John J. Britt. Top row, left to right: Irwin Brown, Tom Bojanowski, unknown person, Benjamin Wishnietsky, Jerry Kedrierski, unknown person. (Florida). (c. 1975)
- Born: March 18, 1915; New Bedford, Massachusetts
- Died: 2013 (aged 97–98)

Benjamin Philip Wishnietsky (18 March 1915 – November 5, 2013) was an American textile chemist and philatelist notable for his collection of postal stamps issued by the Confederate States of America.

== Early life ==
Wishnietsky was born in New Bedford, Massachusetts, to Ukrainian Jewish emigrant parents Mania and Golda (Popovsky) Wishnietsky. His father was a Hebrew teachers and his mother was a seamstress.

== Publications ==
Wishnietsky was the author of Confederate Patriotic Covers and Their Usages (1991), the editor of the Confederate States of America Stampless Cover Catalog (1980), and the editor of the American Stampless Cover Catalog: The Standard Reference Catalog of American Postal History (1978). He has written more than 100 articles for the Confederate Philatelist, most of them in his column "Unusual Confederates." All of his books, several of his "Unusual Confederates" columns, and his Confederate States of America, 1861-1865 exhibit, published by U.S. Philatelic Classics Society, Inc., are available through the American Philatelic Research Library.

Benjamin Wishnietsky authored one book, edited two books and wrote many articles. The books he authored and edited are listed below:

- Authored Confederate Patriotic Covers and Their Usages (1991)
- Edited Confederate States of America Stampless Cover Catalog (1980)
- Edited American Stampless Cover Catalog: The Standard Reference Catalog of American Postal History (1978).

== Philatelic activities ==
He was accredited as an American Philatelic Society judge in 1972 and served for many years. He was named a judge emeritus when he retired. He has won many philatelic awards, most notably the Grand Award at VAPEX in 1975, the Confederate Stamp Alliance trophy in 1975, the NOPEX Reserve Grand Award in 1977, the FLOREX Grand Award (Puerto Rico) in 1980, and the August Dietz Award from the Confederate Stamp Alliance in 1991. He was a great supporter of the Hollywood Stamp Club in Hollywood, Florida and served as editor of their newsletter and on their board of directors for many years. During his tenure as the newsletter editor of the Hollywood Philatelist, the newsletter received American Philatelic Society awards in 1973, 1974, and 1977. He was also a director of the John J. Britt Philatelic Foundation. In 2012, the American Philatelic Society renamed their Champion of Champions Award the Benjamin and Naomi Wishnietsky Champion of Champions Award in his honor.

Benjamin also demonstrated his commitment to passing on his knowledge to the next generation by functioning as the stamp club advisor at two Broward County high schools.

== Personal data ==
Benjamin Wishnietsky retired to Florida and served on the board of the Hollywood Stamp Club, in Hollywood, Florida and was editor of their newsletter, the Hollywood Philatelist for more than 30 years. Benjamin and his wife Naomi were happily married for 48 years. He died in 2013. [Florida Certification of Death dated Nov 12, 2013]

== Collection sale ==
Benjamin Wishnietsky collection of Confederate States postal history was sold by Robert A. Siegel Auction Galleries in February 2014.

The collection included rare Confederate postal history items, such as one of only two recorded "Southern Letter Unpaid" covers bearing the 1860 12¢ black George Washington stamp from plate 3 paired on the cover with the 1857 3¢ dull red Washington type III and a vertical pair of the 1863 Confederate States 10¢ blue Jefferson Davis with frame line.

== See also ==
- John J. Britt
- Philatelic literature
