= Diena (surname) =

Diena is a surname.

- Family of Italian philatelists:
  - Alberto Diena, (1894–1977)
  - Emilio Diena (1860–1941)
  - Enzo Diena (1927–2000)
  - Mario Diena (1891-1971)
- Adriano Diena (1857–1943), Italian politician
- Armando Diena (1914 – 1985), Italian professional football player
- Marisa Diena (1916-2013), Italian-Jewish resistance fighter in World War II
- Ferruccio Diena (1912 – 1996), Italian professional football player
