= Frank Crown =

American philatelist

Francis J. (Frank) Crown, Jr.
- Engineering career
- Institutions: Confederate Stamp Alliance
- Projects: Author of philatelic literature on postal history of the Confederate States of America and Georgia; member of the editorial board of the CSA Catalog project
- Awards: Honorary title of "general" within the Confederate Stamp Alliance

Francis J. (Frank) Crown, Jr. of Capshaw, Alabama, is a noted collector of postage stamps and postal history of the Confederate States of America. He is a retired United States military officer.

== Collecting interests ==
Mr. Crown started collecting stamps at a very early age and by the time he was 15 he developed an interest in postage stamps of the Confederate States of America. He specialized in the study of the early postal history of Georgia, including its postmasters provisionals as well as its specific postal history during the American Civil War.

== Philatelic activity ==
In addition to writing numerous articles on Confederate postal history, Crown is author of a number of books: Confederate Postal History, Surveys of the Confederate Postmasters' Provisionals, and Preliminary Census of Georgia Postmasters' Provisionals. And, because of his knowledge and interest in 19th century postal history of Georgia, Mr. Crown was editor of the Georgia Postal History Society journal Georgia Post Roads and also prepared and published the Georgia Stampless Cover Catalog and Handbook.

== CSA Catalog project ==
At the Confederate Stamp Alliance, Frank Crown is on the editorial board of the CSA Catalog project which updated August Dietz’s The Postal Service of the Confederate States of America and re-published it as the Confederate States of America: Catalog and Handbook of Stamps and Postal History (alongside co-authors Jerry S. Palazolo and Trish Kaufmann) in 2012.

== See also ==
- Postage stamps and postal history of the Confederate States
