= Edward B. Evans =

British army officer & philatelist (1848-1922)

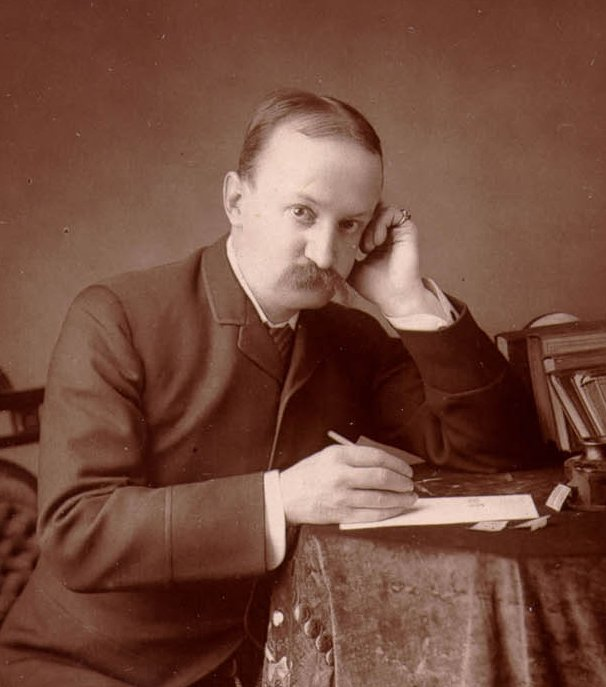
Edward B. Evans.

Edward Benjamin Evans (3 November 1846 – 21 March 1922), a British army officer also known as "Major Evans", was a distinguished philatelist, stamp collector, and philatelic journalist. His philatelic specialization included Mauritius, the Confederate States of America, the Mulready envelopes, and the Indian feudatory states.

== Early life ==
Evans was born at Norwich, England, and commenced collecting stamps as a student at Uppingham Grammar School in 1861. He was commissioned as an officer in the Royal Artillery in 1867. Posted to Malta, he met Lieutenant Speranza, formerly Secretary of the London Philatelic Society, and studied Italian, which enabled him to translate and introduce Dr. Emilio Diena's work on the postal history of the Italian States to English speaking philatelists.

== Mauritius ==
Posted to Mauritius in 1876, Evans assembled an extraordinary collection of that country's stamps. These included a famous example of the One Penny Red "Post Office" Mauritius lightly postmarked on an envelope, which may have contained an invitation to the governor's ball, and several unused Two Pence "Post Paid" in indigo and dark blue. He sent a paper on these issues to the "Congrès International des Timbrophiles" at Paris in 1878, which earned an award from the Société Française de Timbrologie. In 1885, when Evans' collection was broken up, these (and many others) were bought by Thomas Tapling. They are now in the British Library.

After giving up his general collection, Evans specialized in the stamps of the Confederate States, and published many articles on this subject in the Stanley Gibbons Monthly Journal, which he edited for 23 years. His Confederate States collection was purchased by a New York City dealer, John Klemann of Nassau Stamp Co., about 1914. He also wrote a series of excellent articles on the Indian feudatory states.

Evans' study of the Mulready envelopes and satires was described in The Philatelic Record in 1891. Evans' Mulready collection, purchased by King George V, resides in the Royal Collection.

== Organised philately ==
Evans became a member of the Royal Philatelic Society London in 1875. He was one of the original three members of the RPS' Expert Committee in 1894, and helped edit and publish many of the Society's handbooks. Evans was Chairman of the Permanent Committee of the Philatelic Congress of Great Britain, 1911–1919. He served as one of the judges at the London Philatelic Exhibition 1890, 1897 and 1906. He received the Lindenberg Medal of the Berliner Philatelisten-Klub (Berlin Philatelic Club) in 1908, Major Evans was one of the first twenty on the Roll of Distinguished Philatelists in 1921.

Evans died at his residence at Cantley, Norfolk on 22 March 1922.

== Works ==
- "On Stamp Collecting" as "Cheth" in the North of England Stamp Review and Advertizer, Nov. 1864.
- "The Stamps of Mauritius" in The Philatelic Record, Vol. 2, No. 13, February 1880, pp. 6–8; Vol. 2, No. 14, March 1880, pp. 17–20; Vol. 2, No. 15, April 1880, pp. 31–34.; and Vol. 2, No. 16, May 1880, pp. 48–52.
- A Catalogue for Collectors of Postage Stamps, Stamped Envelopes, Wrappers and Postcards, Pemberton Wilson & Co., London, 1882–83. (published in parts)
- E. L. Pemberton, The Philatelic Handbook, new ed. Edward B. Evans, Stanley Gibbons & Co. (1885)
- Catalogue of the Postage Stamps of Peru, C. H. Mekeel, St. Louis (1887)
- The Philatelic Catalogue of Postage Stamps, Envelopes, Wrappers and Cards, Up to 1 January 1890, C. H. Mekeel, St. Louis. (1890)
- Stanley Gibbons Monthly Journal, edited by Edward B. Evans (1891 - 1914)
- The Mulready Envelope and its Caricatures, Stanley Gibbons Philatelic Handbooks. (1891)
- Emilio Diena, A History of the Postage Stamps of Sicily, tr. Edward B. Evans, London. (1904)
