= Kalckhoff =

Kalckhoff may refer to:

- Kalckhoff Medal, a German literary prize
- Andreas Kalckhoff (born 1944), German historian and writer
- Franz Kalckhoff (1860–1955), German philatelist
