= Louise Boyd Dale =

American philatelist (1913–1967)

- Born: March 30, 1913; New York City
- Died: December 15, 1967 (aged 54); New York City
- Education: Vassar College, Poughkeepsie
- Parent: Daughter of Alfred F. Lichtenstein
- Engineering career
- Institutions: Collectors Club of New York; Philatelic Foundation
- Projects: Was a distinguished philatelist who continued to expand the collections of her father, Alfred F. Lichtenstein; served at various posts at the Collectors Club of New York and at the Philatelic Foundation
- Awards: Lichtenstein Medal; APS Hall of Fame

Louise Boyd Dale (March 30, 1913 – December 15, 1967) was a philatelist of the first rank, and the daughter of fellow philatelist Alfred F. Lichtenstein.

Born in New York City, she was raised as a stamp collector from an early age in the environment of her father’s rare collections and numerous prominent philatelic friends, she herself became a collector of stamps and a recognized figure in the field of philately.

Serious philatelic research and collecting, up to the early 20th century, was generally regarded as a field for "men only" to enjoy. Louise Boyd Dale was prominent in breaking this cultural mold, and establishing women in the ranks of philately. She became a "first woman" in a number of positions previously held only by men.

== Collecting interests ==
Louise Dale was responsible for building a number of valuable philatelic collections, some based on the collections of her father, Alfred Lichtenstein. One of her principal collections was that of the postage stamps of British Africa and Asia. Some of her other philatelic acquisitions included very rare items, such as imperforate pairs of the 1875 government reprints of the 1857 issue of the United States and the Bordeaux issues of France.

After she inherited Alfred Lichtenstein's stamp collection and, as the years and decades passed, the Buenos Aires “barquitos” tete-beche pair was never seen again, nor was it offered in the series of Dale-Lichtenstein public auctions held by the H. R. Harmer firm. After the last of the Dale-Lichtenstein collection was sold, any hope for the tete-beche pair’s survival was lost.

== Philatelic activity ==
Dale became a member of the Collectors Club of New York in 1931 and served the club in various capacities. From 1955 to 1967 she served as Trustee to the club.

At the Philatelic Foundation she was Chairman of the Board and of the Expert Committee from 1953 to 1967. While working with the Philatelic Foundation, she continued to build up the Foundation's Reference Library and Reference Collection.

== Honors and awards ==
Louise Boyd Dale was honored for her service to the field of philately in a number of ways. She was:

- the first woman to serve as a judge at an international philatelic exhibition (FIPEX)
- first woman to sign the Roll of Distinguished Philatelists (in 1956)
- appointed to the jury of the London International Stamp Exhibition in 1960
- awarded the Lichtenstein Medal in 1962
- entered into the American Philatelic Society Hall of Fame in 1968.

== Personal life ==
Louise Boyd Lichtenstein married John Denny Dale (May 16, 1916 - April 20, 1993). They lived in New Canaan, CT, and Red Bank, NJ. They had two children: Anne Boyd Dale (born January 4, 1941), and John Denny Dale Jr (born October 23, 1947)

== Legacy ==
After her death at the early age of 54 in 1967, many of the collections were held by the Anne Boyd Lichtenstein Foundation and made available to students and philatelic organizations to further philatelic research.
