= Henry M. Goodkind =

American philatelist (1900–1970)

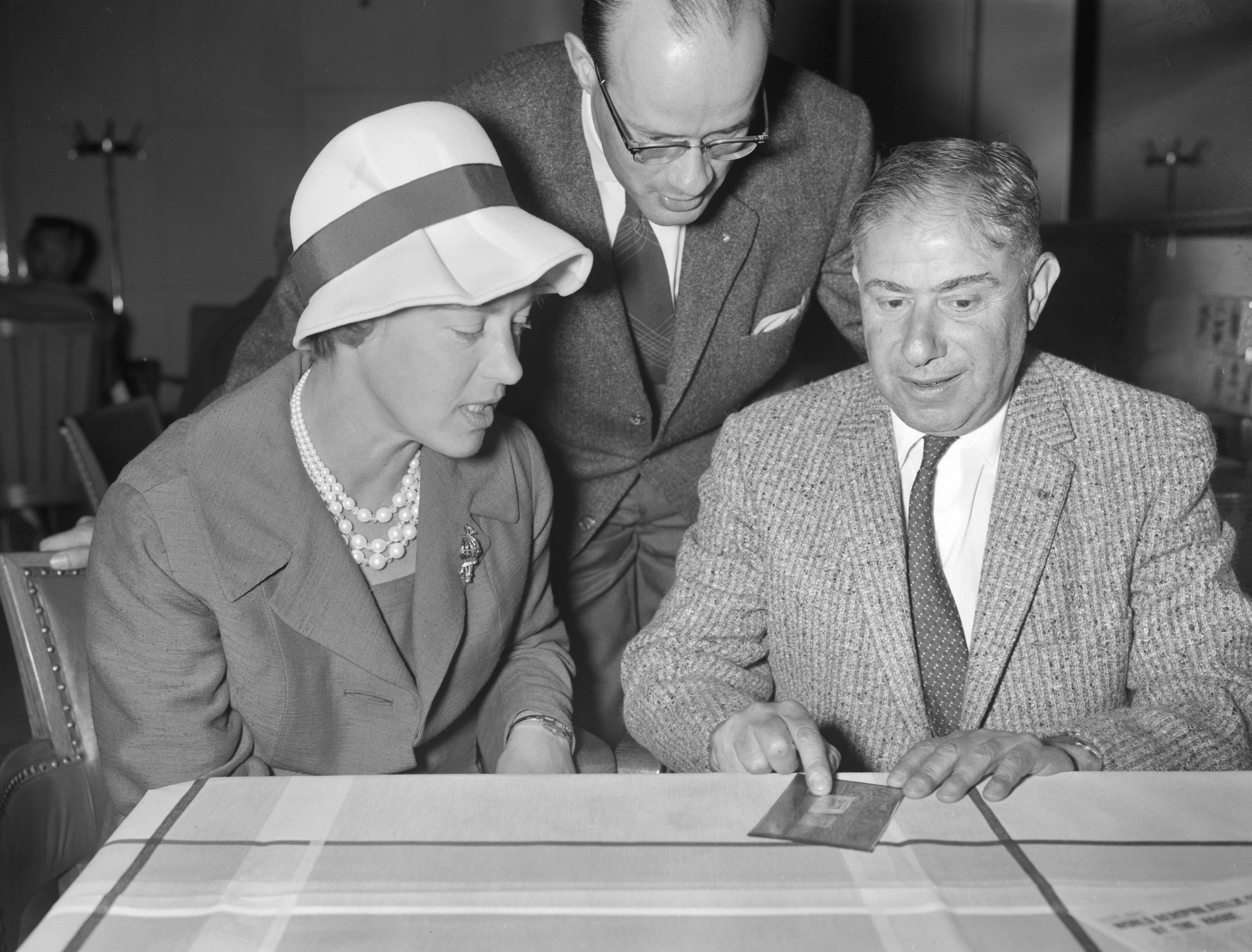
- Goodkind in the Netherlands (1961)
- Born: December 3, 1904
- Died: August 9, 1970 (aged 65)
- Engineering career
- Institutions: Collectors Club of New York
- Projects: Wrote books on air mail postage stamps of the world; wrote over 250 articles on air mail stamps
- Awards: APS Hall of Fame; Lichtenstein Medal

Henry M. Goodkind (December 3, 1900 – August 9, 1970) of New York City, was a distinguished American philatelist who specialized in the study of air mail postage stamps of the world, and published numerous articles and studies on the subject.

== Philatelic literature ==
Goodkind was a prolific writer of philatelic literature on air mail stamps, writing over two hundred and fifty articles on the subject. He also wrote a number of books on air mail philately:

- United States: The First Air Mail Stamp (1951)
- United States: The 24c Air Mail Inverted Center of 1918 (1956)
- United States: RF (République Française) Overprints on Air Mail Stamps and Stationery 1944-1945 (1958)
- United States: The 5c Beacon Air Mail Stamp of 1928 (1965)

== Philatelic activity ==
Henry M. Goodkind was active in the Collectors Club of New York, where he edited the Collectors Club Philatelist from 1949 to 1970. He was an advisory editor for the Sanabria Air Mail Catalog in 1944, and edited The Aero Philatelist's News (subsequently called The Aero Philatelist Annals) during the years 1946 to 1953.

== Honors and awards ==
Goodkind received numerous honors nationally and internationally for his dedication to aerophilately. He received the Lichtenstein Medal in 1963, signed the Roll of Distinguished Philatelists in 1966, and was named to the American Philatelic Society Hall of Fame in 1975.

== Legacy ==
According to the Scott Postage Stamp Catalog, air mail postage stamps were issued by postal authorities during the first half of the 20th century and discontinued during the decades after World War II. Goodkind's philatelic literature helps illustrate this period of aerophilately within the wider field of philately.
