= Alfred H. Caspary =

American philatelist

- Born: 1877
- Died: January 7, 1955 (aged 77–78)

Alfred H. Caspary (1877–1955), of New York City, was a philatelist responsible for assembling one of the finest collections of United States postage stamps. He also served in a number of philatelic positions in the United States and in England.

== Collecting interests ==
Caspary is remembered for his collection of United States stamps, which included postmaster provisionals of both the United States of America and the Confederate States of America, The collection also included United States carrier and local stamps.

Around the time Ferrary’s Buenos Aires 1859 1p "In Ps" tete-beche pair reached the market in 1923 and was acquired by Alfred Lichtenstein, another example of the Buenos Aires “Barquitos” “in Pesos” tete-beche was discovered in Germany and sold to Alfred H. Caspary. The Caspary pair proved that Position 33 in the plate of 48 was upside down relative to all others.

When Caspary died, the collection was broken up and sold by the H.R. Harmer auction house between 1955 and 1958, realizing record prices for many of the finest items in the collection.

After Caspary’s death, H. R. Harmer sold his South American collection in June 1958. Following Caspary the “In Peso” vertical tete-beche pair was owned in succession by Lars Amundsen, Joseph Schatzkes, John R. Boker Jr., and Gabriel Sanchez. It entered the Islander Collection at the October 28, 1982 Corinphila auction of the Sanchez collection, realizing CHF 181,500 (approximately US $89,000).

== Philatelic activity ==
Alfred Caspary was one of the founders of the Philatelic Foundation and served as a member. At the Committee of the Royal Philatelic Society London, Caspary was named an advisor.

== Honors and awards ==
His signature was carried by a distinguished group of American philatelists to the Philatelic Congress of Great Britain in 1954 as he was too ill to make the trip to England in 1952 to sign the Roll of Distinguished Philatelists. The signature was then photographed and transferred to the roll. In 1977 Caspary was named to the American Philatelic Society Hall of Fame.
