= John Robert Boker Jr. =

American philatelist

- Born: January 29, 1913; New York City
- Died: April 12, 2003 (aged 90); Scarsdale, New York
- Engineering career
- Institutions: Collectors Club of New York; Philatelic Foundation
- Projects: Amassed some of the most significant collections of 19th century stamps; served as judge at philatelic exhibitions; president of the Collectors Club of New York
- Awards: Tilleard Medal; Luff Award; APS Hall of Fame; Lichtenstein Medal; Neinken medal Lindenberg Medal

John Robert Boker Jr. (January 29, 1913 – April 12, 2003) was an American philatelist who amassed some of the most prestigious collections of 19th century stamps ever seen by stamp collectors. Before his death in 2003, the Collectors Club of New York declared him, in 1996, to be the "outstanding philatelist of the last half of the twentieth century."

== Collecting interests ==
Boker was able to put together some of the finest collections of rare postage stamps ever seen in philately, with his German States collection probably being his finest. He was also an expert in early American postal history, and was responsible for rewriting large sections of the Scott Standard Postage Stamp Catalog with regard to United States postmaster provisionals, locals and carriers.

John Boker also accumulated large collections of Australian States, State of Buenos Aires, Confederate States of America, Fernando Po, Ionian Islands, Réunion, Romania, Serbia, and the Spanish Philippines. His research of U.S. postal history allowed him to write extensive articles on the subject. He owned the only known surviving copy of the Buenos Aires 1859 1p "In Ps" tete-beche pair.

He was also interesting in precancels of United States stamps, and had almost a complete collection. Among other work he dedicated to the subject, he was editor of the Hoover Brothers Precancel Town List.

== Philatelic activity ==
In addition to writing numerous articles on philatelic subjects, Boker remained very much involved in philatelic activities, such as at major philatelic exhibitions, where he served as judge. At the Collectors Club of New York he served as president and as governor. At the Philatelic Foundation he served as trustee and as chairman of the expert committee.

== Honors and awards ==
Boker received numerous awards and honors. These included the Lichtenstein award in 1967, the Tilleard Medal in 1965, the Luff Award in 1978, the Lindenberg Medal in 1981, the Neinken medal in 1983, and the Robson Lowe memorial medal in 2000. He signed the Roll of Distinguished Philatelists in 1964, and received the Smithsonian Institution’s Philatelic Achievement award. He was named a Distinguished Philatelist by the United States Philatelic Classics Society in 2002, elevated to the American Philatelic Society Hall of Fame in 2004

== Legacy ==
The sale of his German States stamp collection, from 1985 to 2000, was so extensive that it required eighteen auctions by Köhler to complete its sale. The illustrated auction catalogs of this sale represent a significant contribution to philatelic literature and philatelic knowledge.

== See also ==
- Philately
- Philatelic literature
