= Czesław Słania =

Polish postage stamp and banknote engraver

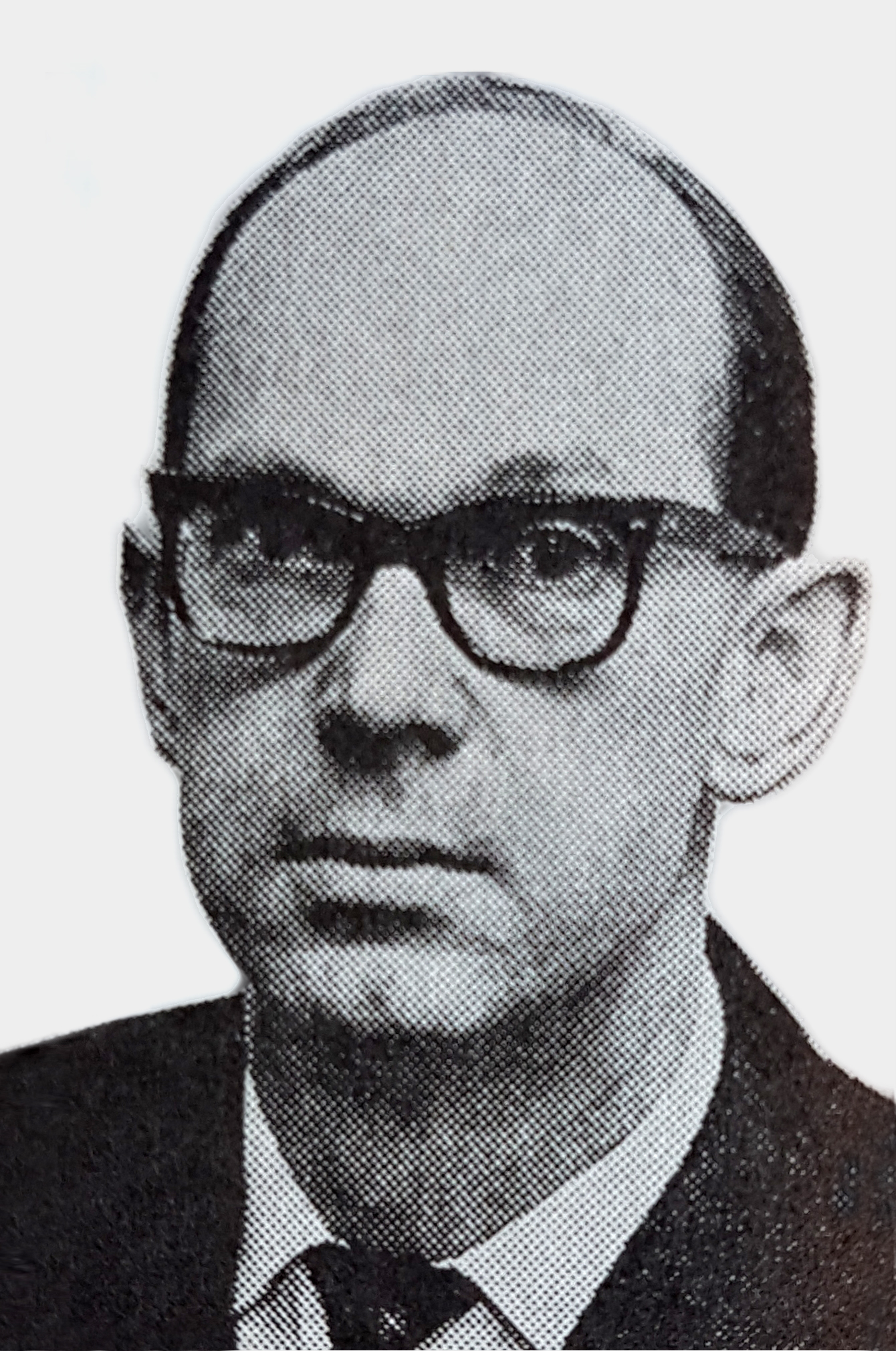
Portrait of Czesław Słania

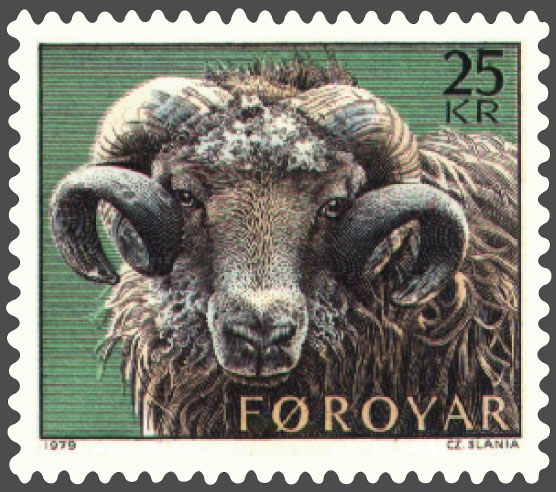
A Faroese stamp depicting a ram engraved by Słania (1979)

Czesław Słania (22 October 1921 Czeladź; 17 March 2005 Kraków) was a Polish postage stamp and banknote engraver, living in Sweden from 1956. According to the Guinness Book of World Records, Słania was the most skilled and prolific of all stamp engravers, with over 1000 stamps to his credit. His 1000th engraved stamp, based on the 17th-century painting "Great Deeds by Swedish Kings" by David Klöcker Ehrenstrahl (2000), is in the Guinness Book as the largest engraved stamp ever issued.

== Life ==
Słania was born in Czeladź, Poland, and was the son of a miner. During the German invasion of Poland and outbreak of World War II in 1939, he was a student of a gymnasium in Lublin. During the subsequent German occupation he forged German money and documents for the Polish resistance, and in the later part of the war he became a soldier of the Second Polish Army. After the war, as a demobilized lieutenant, he settled in 1945 in Pisarzowice. Unwilling to become a farmer, he entered the Kraków School of Fine Arts, a renowned graphics arts centre, that same year. While still a student, Słania was employed by the Polish Stamp Printing Works in Łódź and Warsaw, where he learned to engrave in steel. His first stamp was issued in Poland on 24 March 1951.

In 1956, Słania moved to Sweden, where he began employment with the Swedish postal authorities in 1959. He produced stamps for Sweden and 30 other countries. His work was of such recognized quality and detail that he is one of the very few "household names" among philatelists, and some specialize in collecting his work.

He was the Royal Court Engraver of Sweden since 1972.

In 2000, his 1000th stamp was issued in Sweden, and his 1001st stamp was issued in Poland. His last work was a stamp in 2005 to commemorate the 60th session of the United Nations General Assembly.

Słania was also involved in designing and engraving banknotes for several countries.

== Awards ==
Czesław Słania received many awards during his life, including:

- Commander of the Order of Merit of the Republic of Poland 1999
- Order of Saint Charles
- Knight of the Order of the Dannebrog (Denmark)
- Order Mérite Culturel (Monaco)
- Robert Stolz Music Prize (Sweden 1983)
- Rowland Hill Award 2002

== Bibliography ==
- Mesteren Czeslaw Slania: Biografi og katalog (1986) ISBN 9788770121392
- Milewski, Janusz (2001). "Czesław Słania w Jeleniej Górze". Rocznik Jeleniogórski (in Polish). Vol. XXXIII. Jelenia Góra. ISSN 0080-3480.
- The Engraving Art of Czesław Słania: A Compendium (1996) ISBN 9780965251600
