= Jerry S. Palazolo =

American philatelist and Confederate stamp collector

- Organizations: Confederate Stamp Alliance
- Known for: Expert on the study of postal history of the Confederate States of America and especially Tennessee, Mississippi and Arkansas; member of the editorial board of the CSA Catalog project
- Awards: Honorary title of "general" within the Confederate Stamp Alliance

Jerry S. Palazolo of Memphis, Tennessee, is a collector and expert of postage stamps and postal history of the Confederate States of America. He is also owner of a retail wine and liquor business.

== Collecting interests ==
Palazolo is a collector with knowledge of all aspects of postal history of the Confederate States of America. However, he specializes in the study of postal history of Tennessee, Mississippi and Arkansas, from the founding of postal systems in those areas and on through 1869.

== Philatelic activity ==
Jerry Palazolo has served as editor and co-editor of various philatelic handbooks and catalogues. He has amassed a library of philatelic literature of over one thousand documents.

At the Confederate Stamp Alliance, Jerry Palazolo is chairman of the Authentication Service.

== CSA Catalog project ==
Jerry S. Palazolo is on the editorial board of the CSA Catalog project which is updating August Dietz’s The Postal Service of the Confederate States of America and re-publishing it as the Confederate States Catalog and Handbook, planned to be published in 2010.

== See also ==
- Postage stamps and postal history of the Confederate States
