= Rosende =

Rosende is a surname and may refer to:

- Alberto Rosende (born 1993), American actor
- Diego Rosende (born 1986), Chilean footballer
- Petrona Rosende (1797–1863), first female journalist in Argentina
- Roberto Rosende, American philatelist
