= Ernest Anthony Kehr =

American philatelist (1911–1986)

- Born: September 10, 1911; Davos, Switzerland
- Died: November 13, 1986 (aged 75)
- Engineering career
- Institutions: Collectors Club of New York
- Projects: Promoted stamp collecting in various media, including over 2,000 shows on radio and television.
- Awards: Lichtenstein Medal; RDP; APS Hall of Fame; Luff Award

Ernest Anthony Kehr (September 10, 1911 – November 13, 1986), of New York City, was a promoter and spokesman of stamp collecting, creating interest for the hobby using all media at the time, including radio, television, books, articles and newspapers columns devoted to philately; an American philatelist who was added to the Roll of Distinguished Philatelists in 1975.

== Philatelic literature ==
Kehr had philatelic columns in numerous newspapers, including the New York World-Telegram, the New York Herald Tribune, and Long Island’s Newsday. On radio and television, he promoted philately in over two thousand shows. He wrote several books, with the most popular one being The Romance of Stamp Collecting published in 1947.

== Philatelic activity ==
Kehr was active in the Collectors Club of New York and wrote numerous articles in its philatelic publications. He was the special representative for the United States for the Royal Philatelic Society London.

== Honors and awards ==
Besides being named an Honorary Fellow of the Collectors Club of New York, Kehr received the Lichtenstein Medal in 1974, signed the Roll of Distinguished Philatelists in 1975, and was awarded the Luff Award in 1976 for Exceptional Contributions to Philately. He was named to the American Philatelic Society Hall of Fame in 1987.

== Legacy ==
The Ernest A. Kehr award for excellence in the promotion of Youth Philately was established by the American Philatelic Society in 1991 in his honor.

== Bibliography ==
- Commemorative Stamps of Egypt (St. Joseph, Missouri: The Stamp Review, [1938])
- Guide to Stamp Appraising (1941)
- 20th Century Stamps of Egypt (Kalamazoo, Michigan: Chambers Publishing, 1942)
- The Essays of Egypt (1942)
- The Romance of Stamp Collecting (1947)
- Hints for Collectors (1948)
- El apasionante mundo de la filatelia (1952)
- Philatelic Public Relations (1953)
- My Hobby Is Collecting Stamps (1955)
- Watch Out for Stamp Fakers! (1955)
- The Romance of Stamp Collecting: Notes from the World of Stamps, Stamp Collecting, and Stamp Collectors (New York: Crowell, 1956)
- Vatican: The Stamps and a Description of Their Designs (1956)
- The Interpostals of Egypt, 1864-1892 (1962)
- (posthumous, edited by Philip Cockrill), Egypt: The Posta Europea and 1984 Kehr Catalogue of Interpostals (1983)

== See also ==
- Philately
- Philatelic literature
