= Paul Hilmar Jensen =

Norwegian philatelist (1930–2004)

- Born: 28 April 1930
- Died: 17 July 2004 (aged 74)
- Engineering career
- Projects: Won gold medals at philatelic shows; recognized by the King of Norway for his philatelic efforts
- Awards: Lichtenstein Medal; APS Hall of Fame; Anderssen-Dethloff Medal

Paul Hilmar Jensen (28 April 1930 – 17 July 2004), was a Norwegian philatelist whose collections often won gold at philatelic shows, and whose work in community service in the field of philately was recognized by King Harald V of Norway.

== Collecting interests ==
Jensen had wide knowledge of the entire field of philately but specialized in the collection and study of postage stamps and postal history of certain countries, especially Czechoslovakia, Cook Islands, Saudi Arabia, and Norway. His exhibits at various stamp shows generally won the gold prize.

== Philatelic activity ==
Jensen was a founder and the first president of the Norwegian Postal History Society, served as president of the Norwegian Philatelic Federation and the FIP Postal History Commission. He was also named vice president of the Norwegian philatelic exhibition NORWEX 1980 and later secretary general of NORWEX 1997.

Along with Patrick Pearson and Robert P. Odenweller, Jensen was co-author of the F.I.P. Guide to Exhibiting and Judging Traditional and Postal History Exhibits, published in 1993. Jensen was also a noted speaker on philatelic subjects, and dedicated efforts to introduce youth into the hobby of stamp collecting.

== Honors and awards ==
Jensen received many awards and recognition, especially a notable one by King Harald V of Norway for his philatelic efforts. He signed the Roll of Distinguished Philatelists in 1988 and received awards which included: the Anderssen-Dethloff Medal of Norway, the Copenhagen Philatelic Club Medal, the Lichtenstein Medal, the FIP Medal of Service, and the Golden Lion of the Norwegian Philatelic Federation.

Jensen was a Fellow of the Royal Philatelic Society London, and was named to the American Philatelic Society Hall of Fame in 2007.

== References and sources ==
Sources

- Paul Hilmar Jensen at bordewick-family.com Archived here.
