= Lindenberg Medal =

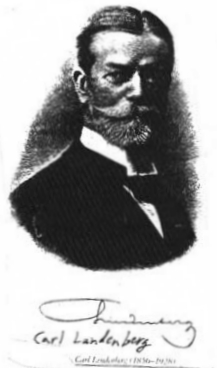
Dr. Carl Lindenberg

The Lindenberg Medal is an award given to those who provide “conspicuous service to philately” because of their investigations and contributions to philatelic literature.

It is considered by some as the Nobel Prize of Philately.

== Origin ==
The medal was authorized by the Berlin Philatelic Club (Berliner Philatelisten-Klub) in 1905 in honor of noted philatelist Judge Carl Lindenberg.

== Carl Lindenberg ==
Carl Lindenberg (1850–1928), a judge and major stamp collector in Germany, began collecting at age seven in 1857, headed the Berliner Philatelisten-Klub, and initiated the Lindenberg medal in 1905. He was instrumental in exposing Fouré’s forgeries of German postal stationery and in giving the Reichsmuseum a cover with the Moldavian Bulls.

== Recipients ==
Recipients of the medal include:

- Nils Strandell (Schweden)
- Edward Denny Bacon (England)
- Dr. F. Diena (Italy)
- M. Hancian (Belgium)
- Major E. B. Evans (England)
- M. P. Castle (England)
- Eugen Derocco (Yugoslavia)
- Hans Kropf (Austria)
- Pierre Mahe (France)
- Franz Kalckhoff (Germany)
- Judge V. Suppantschitsch (Austria)
- Dr. José Marcó del Pont (Argentine)
- August Dietz (USA)
- Wolfgang Hellrigl
- Carroll Chase (USA)
- John Robert Boker, Jr. (USA)
- Herbert J. Bloch (USA)
- Soichi Ichida (Japan)
- Emilio Diena (Italy)
- Enzo Diena (Italy)
- Charles Lathrop Pack (USA)
- Walter Dorning Beckton (England)
- A.M. Tracey Woodward
