= London Philatelic Exhibition 1890 =

The London Philatelic Exhibition 1890 was held 19–26 May at the Portman Rooms, Baker Street, London. It was one of the first international philatelic exhibitions anywhere and it was the exhibition at which the Duke of Edinburgh announced that Prince George of Wales, later King George V, was a stamp collector. The exhibition marked the fiftieth anniversary of the introduction of penny postage and the issue of the first stamps.

== Souvenirs ==
About 2700 unissued Mauritius Britannia-seated stamps were overprinted L.P.E. 1890 in red from imperforate sheets remaindered in 1872. The original printers, Perkins Bacon, perforated the stamps at the exhibition and overprints and varieties were additionally made by M.P. Castle.

== Exhibitors and awards ==
Prominent exhibitors and some of their awards included:

- Thomas Tapling
- Major E.B. Evans
- Edward Denny Bacon
- M. P. Castle - Gold medal for display of New South Wales
- Ludwig Schwarz
- Dr Emilio Diena
- Anthony de Worms
- The Earl of Kingston - Gold medal for display of Great Britain
- Douglas Garth - Gold medal for display of India and Ceylon
- Louis Blanchard - Gold medal for display of Switzerland
- Gilbert Harrison - Gold medal for United States stamped envelopes

Printers showing their works included:

- Blades, East & Blades
- Perkins Bacon
- Waterlow & Sons

Other exhibitors included:

- The Board of Inland Revenue
- The British Post Office
- The Government of New South Wales
- The Government of Tasmania
- The Government of India
- The Government of Victoria
- The Government of Cape of Good Hope
- The Crown Agents
- The British North Borneo Company

== See also ==
- List of philatelic exhibitions (by country)
