= Diena (disambiguation) =

Diena may refer to:

== People ==
- Diena (surname)
- Diena Georgetti (born 1966), Australian artist

== Media ==
- Diena, a newspaper in Latvia
- Diena (Lithuania) , a newspaper in Lithuania (1994–1996)
- Diena Media, Lithuanian media group
  - Vilniaus diena
  - Kauno diena

== Other ==
- Diena, Mali, a town and commune in Mali
