= Francis Kiddle =

British philatelist (1942–2015)

- Born: 1942
- Died: 2015 (aged 72–73)
- Occupation: Philatelist

Francis Edgar Kiddle (1942 – 21 October 2015) was a British philatelist who achieved an international reputation in the field of philatelic literature and cinderella philately.

== Philately ==
Kiddle became a Council Member of the Royal Philatelic Society London in 1977 and was given the post of Honorary Librarian in 1979, serving in the role until 1994. He was then elected as the President of the society for the next two years. In 1995 he was asked to sign the Roll of Distinguished Philatelists

He was also an FIP (Federation Internationale de Philatelie) accredited judge and Chairman of the FIP Revenue Commission. Kiddle was also Chairman of the Trustees of the British Philatelic Trust.

From 2005 he was the Curator of the Perkins Bacon Archive for the Royal Philatelic Society London. In 2006 he was awarded the Smithsonian Philatelic Achievement Award.

Until his death, he and his brother Charles wrote a monthly article on cinderella stamps for Stamp Magazine.

== Outside philately ==
Francis Kiddle worked in the space industry retiring in 1997 as assistant director of Space Technology Research, UK, at the Defence Evaluation and Research Agency.

He died on 21 October 2015 of lung cancer, aged 73. He was married to Máire and had two sons, John and Alan. He had two grand children Olivia and Edward.

== Awards and honours ==
- Roll of Distinguished Philatelists 1995.
- Royal Mail Lifetime Achievement Award 2001.
- Smithsonian Philatelic Achievement Award 2006
- Roll of Distinguished Cinderella Philatelists 2006.
- Lichtenstein Medal 2012.
