= Andrew Earl Weatherly =

Stamp historian

- Born: July 10, 1895
- Died: December 1981 (aged 86)
- Engineering career
- Institutions: Confederate Stamp Alliance
- Projects: Expert on postal history of the Confederacy; wrote detailed postal history of North Carolina
- Awards: CSA Honorary General; APS Hall of Fame

Andrew Earl Weatherly (July 10, 1895 – December 1981), of North Carolina, was a philatelist dedicated to the study of postage stamps and history of the Confederate States of America.

== Collecting interests ==
Although Weatherly collected and studied the postage stamps and postal history of the entire confederacy, he was particularly interested in researching the postal history of North Carolina from its earliest days and on through the period of confederacy. His collections of stamps and postal history items of the confederacy earned him gold medals in competition.

== Philatelic literature ==
Weatherly’s studies of the postal and social history of North Carolina led him to publish his findings in The First Hundred Years of Historic Guilford, 1771-1871 in 1972. Weatherly also wrote articles on his findings and published them in such periodicals as the Confederate Philatelist.

== Philatelic activity ==
Andrew Earl Weatherly was a supporter of the Confederate Stamp Alliance (CSA) and served the philatelic organization in various capacities, including acting as its president from 1946 to 1949. Because of his dedication to the aims and goals of the CSA, he was named an honorary “general” in 1950.

== Honors and awards ==
“General” Weatherly was named to the American Philatelic Society Hall of Fame in 1984.

== See also ==
- Philately
- Philatelic literature
