= Barwise =

Barwise is a surname, and may refer to:

- Jon Barwise (1942–2000), American mathematician, philosopher and logician
- Mark Alton Barwise (1881–1937), American politician
- Patrick Barwise (born 1946), British academic

== See also ==
- Barwis
