= Cheryl Ganz =

American philatelist

- Born: 1950 (age 75–76)
- Education: University of Illinois
- Occupation: Philatelist

Cheryl R. Ganz (born 1950) FRPSL is an American philatelist who was appointed to the Roll of Distinguished Philatelists in 2018.

== Family and education ==
After her husband's death, Ganz studied United States history at University of Illinois Chicago (UIC) where she earned her PhD in 2005.

== Philately ==
Ganz has been a collector from an early age, collecting, stamps, coins, seashells but as a teenager became interested in Zeppelins and mail carried on the airships.

In October 2005 Ganz joined the staff of the Smithsonian National Postal Museum in Washington and from January 2007 until February 2014 she was its chief curator. Following her retirement she was appointed "curator of philately emerita" for her "significant and lasting contributions" to the museum; the first employee to win this title.

Ganz is a board director of the American Philatelic Society, a society she has been a member of since 1976. She serves as vice-chair on the United States Postal Service's Citizens' Stamp Advisory Committee. In 2023, Ganz was elected APS President.

== Honors ==
Ganz has been awarded several philatelic honors including:

- 2015 Alumni Achievement Award – University of Illinois, Chicago
- 2016 Lichtenstein Medal for Distinguished Service to Philately – Collectors Club of New York
- 2016 Luff Award for Exceptional Contributions to Philately – American Philatelic Society
- 2018 Roll of Distinguished Philatelists of the Royal Philatelic Society London

== Publications ==
- Ganz, Cheryl R. (2008). The 1933 Chicago World's Fair: A Century of Progress. Chicago: University of Illinois Press. ISBN 978-0-252-03357-5.
- Ganz, Cheryl R. (2015). Every Stamp Tells a Story: The National Philatelic Collection. Washington D.C.: Smithsonian Institution. ISBN 978-1-935-62342-7.
- Ganz, Cheryl R.; Patrick Russell; Dan Grossman (1 May 2017). Zeppelin Hindenburg: An Illustrated History of LZ-129. The History Press. ISBN 978-0-750-96995-6.
