= Winthrop Smillie Boggs =

American philatelist (1902–1974)

- Born: December 20, 1902
- Died: May 30, 1974 (aged 71)
- Engineering career
- Institutions: Collectors Club of New York
- Projects: Authored various books of philatelic literature, especially on stamps of Canada and Newfoundland
- Awards: Luff Award; Crawford Medal; Lichtenstein Medal; APS Hall of Fame

Winthrop Smillie Boggs (December 20, 1902 – May 30, 1974) was a philatelist renowned for his expertise and philatelic writing.

== Philatelic accomplishments ==
Boggs wrote a number of the definitive books in philately:

- The Foundations of Philately (1955)
- Ten Decades Ago: 1840-1850, a Study of the Work of Rawdon, Wright, Hatch and Edson of New York City (1949)
- The Postage Stamps and Postal History of Newfoundland (1942)
- The Postage Stamps and Postal History of Canada (1945)

== Philatelic leadership ==
Boggs was a member of the Collectors Club of New York and served the club in a number of capacities. He was the first executive director at the Philatelic Foundation during the period 1945-1961.

== Honors ==
- The Crawford Medal (1947)
- The John N. Luff Award for Distinguished Philatelic Research (1952)
- The Lichtenstein Medal (1958)
- Signed the Roll of Distinguished Philatelists (1959)
- Elected to the American Philatelic Society Hall of Fame (1974)
