= William Garth =

William Garth may refer to:

- William M. Garth (1863–1934), racehorse trainer who won the 1920 Kentucky Derby
- William Willis Garth (1828–1912), American politician
- William Garth (barrister) (1854–1919), English lawyer, bibliophile
