= Robert P. Odenweller =

American philatelist

Robert P. Odenweller (born 19 September 1938) is an American philatelist who is a member of the National Postal Museum's Council of Philatelists and a signatory to the Roll of Distinguished Philatelists. He is a member of The Collectors Club of New York, and an Honorary Fellow of the Royal Philatelic Society London and the Royal Philatelic Society of New Zealand. From 1996 to 2000 he was President of the Grand Prix Club.

== Early life ==
Odenweller started collecting stamps as a boy, deciding to specialize in New Zealand stamps at the age of seven. He graduated from the US Air Force Academy in 1960, and eventually became an airline pilot for TWA. That career move allowed him to continue his pursuit of philately, becoming an expert, and joining the Royal Philatelic Society London.

== Awards ==
Odenweller was awarded the Crawford Medal (2005) of the Royal Philatelic Society London for his book The Stamps and Postal History of Nineteenth Century Samoa and has been awarded the Lichtenstein Medal (1993), the Smithsonian Philatelic Achievement Award, the Collins Award, the APS Luff Award, and the FIP Medal for Service.

In 2011 he was again awarded the Crawford Medal for his work The Postage Stamps of New Zealand 1855-1873: The Chalon Head Issues.

== Selected publications ==
- Opinions VI Philatelic Expertizing - An Inside View. New York: The Philatelic Foundation, 1992.
- The Stamps and Postal History of Nineteenth Century Samoa. London: Royal Philatelic Society, 2004. ISBN 0-9597883-5-2
- The Postage Stamps of New Zealand 1855-1873: The Chalon Head Issues. London: Royal Philatelic Society, 2009. ISBN 0-473-15397-1

== See also ==
- Postage stamps and postal history of Samoa
