= Buenos Aires 1859 1p "In Ps" tête-bêche pair =

Buenos Aires postage stamps with rare error

Buenos Aires 1859 1p "In Ps" tete-beche pair
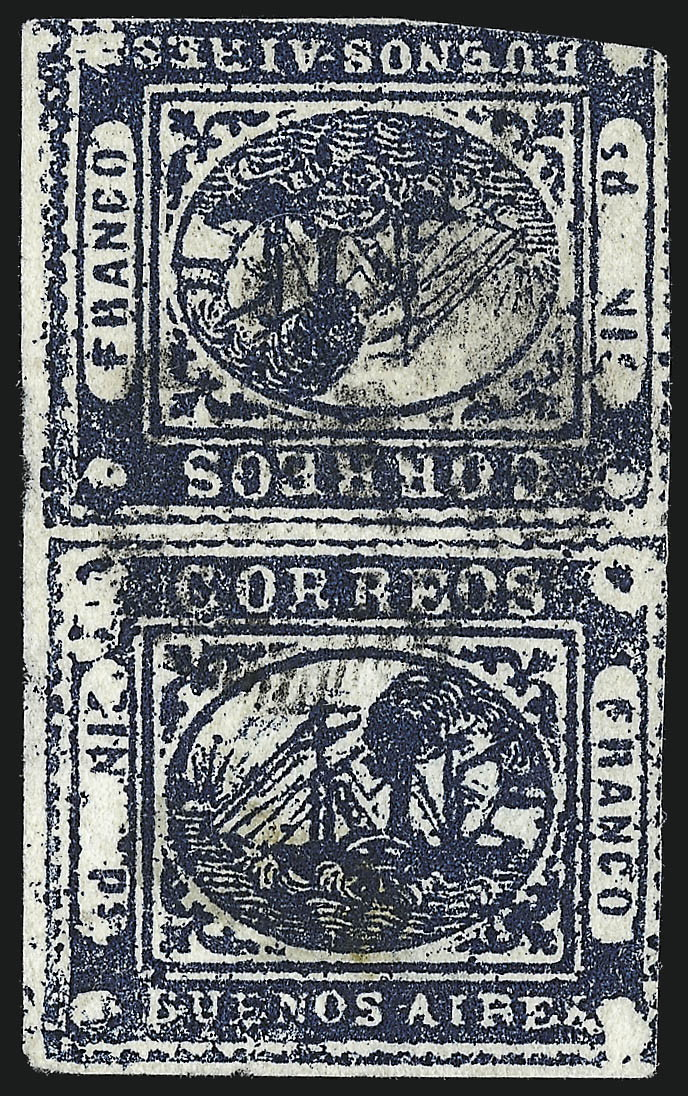
- Country of production: State of Buenos Aires
- Date of production: 1859
- Nature of rarity: Tête-bêche pair, Unique
- No. in existence: 1
- Face value: 1 peso
- Estimated value: $575,000

The Buenos Aires 1859 1p "In Ps" tête-bêche pair, also known as the “In Peso” tête-bêche Pair, is the only known specimen of an inverted error on Barquitos postage stamp issued by the sovereign state of Buenos Aires.

The original plates were constructed of 48 stereotype clichés. At one point, clichés were removed and reaffirmed to the wood base. During this process, one of the clichés was reaffixed upside-down, resulting in the tête-bêche error in position 33 (row 5, stamp 1), which is paired with the correct orientation stamp from position 41 (row 6, stamp 1). This error is different from tête-bêche printing varieties caused by a work-and-turn printing method because cliché errors are true mistakes, while tête-bêche printing varieties are the products of the method.

== History ==
The Barquitos stamps get their name for the barquitos, or small ships, that form the central image of the stamps. They were first issued in April 1858, in denomination of 2, 3, 4 and 5-pesos in blue, green, red and orange, respectively. At the time, the basic single-letter rate was two pesos, but in October postal rates were reduced, making it necessary to produce two additional stamps. Owing to time constraints, the Mint decided to modify the 4 and 5-peso plates to create the 1 peso and 4 reales (half-peso) stamps, respectively. Forgeries of the regular stamps exist and were already well documented in 1882.

The original plates were constructed of 48 stereotype clichés, eight stamps wide and six stamps deep, affixed to a wooden base with a small brass nail in each corner of the clichés. The nails show up as white holes in the design, having been recessed below the level of each metal cliché. The value tablets remained solid on the master dies and from these four matrices the four values were made. Each matrix had the denomination cut into the solid areas: "Dos Ps", "Tres Ps", "Cuato Ps" [sic] and "Cinco Ps". From these the 48 clichés were stereotyped and affixed to the wood base. Unique affixing holes and flaws make it possible to identify different plate positions.

In June 1864, the fact that there were some modifications to the plates of these stamps was already mentioned in the world's first dedicated stamp journal, Stamp Collectors' Review and Monthly Advertiser.

Even Barquitos stamps without notable errors are considered a great classic and highly prized. They were the highest priced stamps listed in the 1868 issue of the Scott Postage Stamp Catalogue, and by the 1940 edition were valued at $3,000.

== Modifications ==
To make the two new denominations, each cliché was altered. The 5-peso value was turned into a 1-peso by modifying the text "Cinco Ps", removing the "C" and "co" to make it read "In Ps". The 4-peso was turned into a 4-reales by removing part of the "Cuato Ps" text. First the lower curve of the "P" was excised, making it read "rs", and later it was modified again by removing the "Cu" and "o" of "Cuato", making it read "T rs", the closest approximation of "1 rs".

== Provenance ==
This pair were exhibited in 1986 as part of the Aristocrats of Philately displays at Ameripex and again at Anphilex in 1996. They were previously owned by Alfred H. Caspary until 1958, Lars Amundsen, Joseph Schatzkés, John Robert Boker, Jr., and Gabriel Sanchez. They were also illustrated in Leon Norman Williams' Encyclopedia of Rare and Famous Stamps. The Caspary vertical tete-beche pair sold in 2008 at auction for $575,000.

== A second example ==
While the Buenos Aires 1859 1p "In Ps" tête-bêche pair is the only known vertical set, a horizontal pairing in position 33 and 34 was first recorded in Philipp von Ferrary's collection. It was later acquired by Alfred F. Lichtenstein in 1923. Lichtenstein later exhibited the stamp in 1940 at the centenary celebrations of the postage stamp, by the Collectors Club of New York. The Ferrary-Lichtenstein horizontal tête-bêche pair has not been seen since 1940 and is presumed lost to philately.
