= Clarence W. Hennan =

American philatelist (1894–1956)

Dr. Clarence William Hennan
- Born: May 22, 1894
- Died: February 28, 1956 (aged 61); Chicago, Illinois
- Engineering career
- Institutions: American Philatelic Congress; American Philatelic Society; Collectors Club of Chicago
- Projects: president of the American Philatelic Congress and the American Philatelic Society
- Awards: Lichtenstein Medal; Newbury Award in 1951 named to the Roll of Distinguished Philatelists in 1956

Clarence William Hennan (May 24, 1894 – February 28, 1956) was an internationally recognized philatelist known for his collection, his exhibits at various stamp exhibitions, and for his expertise in evaluating the authenticity of rare stamps.

== Philatelic literature ==
Hennan authored various articles and books on specific aspects of philately. These include:

- Haiti: Postal History and Stamps (a series published over a 3-year period)
- Curaçao Specialized (book published in 1952)

== Collection interests ==
Dr. Hennan had various collections from which he authored philatelic articles. Today he is remembered for his:

- Chicago Postal History Collection

== Philatelic leadership ==
Dr. Hennan provided leadership in the philatelic field in various ways:

- President of the American Philatelic Congress
- President of the American Philatelic Society
- President of the Collectors Club of Chicago
- Various positions in the Chicago Philatelic Society (Honorary Life Member)

== Awards ==
For his leadership and accomplishments in the field of philately, Dr. Hennan was:

- given the Newbury Award in 1951
- given the Lichtenstein Medal in 1953
- named to the Roll of Distinguished Philatelists in 1956.

== See also ==
- Philately
- Philatelic literature
- Lichtenstein Medal
- Clarence William Hennan
- Collectors Club of New York
