= Robert Granville Stone =

American philatelist

- Born: June 27, 1907
- Died: February 1, 2002 (aged 94)
- Engineering career
- Projects: Studied extensively the field of French Colonies and Danish West Indies postage stamps and postal history
- Awards: Lichtenstein Medal; APS Hall of Fame; Luff Award

Robert Granville Stone (June 27, 1907 – February 1, 2002), was an American philatelic scholar who devoted over fifty years to the study of certain specific segments of philately.

== Collecting interests ==
Stone was particularly interested in postage stamps of French colonies and stamps of the Danish West Indies. He also collected and studied postal history of United States postage stamps used outside the U.S. and postal history of mail that traveled by various types of ships, including pacquetboats.

His specialized stamp collection of Saint Pierre and Miquelon won gold medals when it was exhibited at international philatelic exhibitions.

== Philatelic literature ==
Stone was often referred to as the "Dean of the French Colonies", and he wrote extensively on the subject. His works include: “The French Colonies General Issues”, published in 1961, and multiple articles in The Collectors Club Philatelist, The Essay-Proof Journal, and Philatelic Literature Review. He edited the France and Colonies Philatelist from 1964 to 1994, and contributed many articles to it.

Other significant work he authored include: “Danish West Indies Mails (1754–1917)” and “A Caribbean Neptune: The Maritime Postal Communications of the Greater and Lesser Antilles in the 19th Century.”

== Honors and awards ==
Stone received numerous awards for his work, including the Earl Grant Jacobsen Award of the Scandinavian Collectors Club. the Gerard Gilbert Award of the France and Colonies Philatelic Society, the Lichtenstein Medal in 1982, and the Luff Award for Distinguished Philatelic Research in 1983. He was honored by the Académie de philatélie (in Paris) by admitting him as the first American to be named a corresponding member of the club. In 1984, he signed the Roll of Distinguished Philatelists and, in 2003 he was named to the American Philatelic Society Hall of Fame.

== See also ==
- Philately
- Philatelic literature
