= William Comer Petheram =

English-born British Indian judge (1835-1922)

Sir William Comer Petheram KC
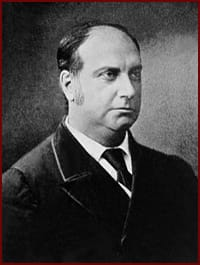

4th Chief Justice of Calcutta High Court
- In office 24 March 1886 – November 1896
- Appointed by: Queen Victoria
- Preceded by: Richard Garth
- Succeeded by: Francis William Maclean

3rd Chief Justice of Allahabad High Court
- In office 1 November 1864 – 23 March 1886
- Appointed by: Queen Victoria
- Preceded by: Robert Stuart
- Succeeded by: John Edge

Personal details
- Born: 1835 Lympsham, Somerset
- Died: 15 May 1922 (aged 86–87)
- Spouse: Isabel Congreve
- Relations: Sir William Congreve (father-in-law),
- Parent: William Petheram of Pinhoe
- Occupation: lawyer, judge
- Profession: Chief Justice

Sir William Comer Petheram KC (1835 – 15 May 1922) was an English-born British Indian judge. He was the Chief Justice of Allahabad High Court and Calcutta High Court. He was also the Vice Chancellor of University of Calcutta. He was made a Knight Bachelor in 1884.

== Career ==
Petheram was born in 1835 in Lympsham, Somerset, the son of William Petheram of Pinhoe. In 1862 he was qualified as Special Pleader and passed from Middle Temple in 1869. He joined service as Chief Judge of the Chief Court of North-Western Provinces in India. Petheram first served as Chief justice of Allahabad High Court on 1 November 1884 to 1886 then became the Chief Justice of Calcutta High Court on 24 March 1886 after Sir Richard Garth and retired in November 1896. In 1887-90 he was also the Vice Chancellor of the Calcutta University. In 1864, he wrote a book named The law and practice relating to discovery by interrogatories under the Common law procedure act, 1854.

He presided over the first seditious libel case in colonial india.

He was knighted in 1884.

He married Isabel Congreve, daughter of Sir William Congreve, 2nd Baronet.

Legal offices
Preceded by Sir Richard Garth	Chief Justice of Bengal; 1886–1896	Succeeded by Sir Francis William Maclean
