= Norman S. Hubbard =

American philatelist

Dr. Norman S. Hubbard FRPSL was an American philatelist and former chairman of the Philatelic Foundation. He was appointed to the Roll of Distinguished Philatelists in 1996. He received the Alfred Lichtenstein Memorial Award for 1997 He was a fellow of the Royal Philatelic Society London. Hubbard was a specialist in the philately of South America and Uruguay in particular. He died Feb. 18, 2026.
