= Patricia Stilwell Walker =

American philatelist

- Occupation: Philatelist

Patricia Stilwell Walker is an American philatelist who signed the Roll of Distinguished Philatelists in 2022.

She won the 2006 Lichtenstein Medal for her contributions to philately.

In 2011, she received the Luff Award for Exceptional Contributions to Philately.

Irish postal history to 1900 is one of Walker's collecting topics as is her material about the city of Baltimore. She is a philatelic judge accredited by the International Federation of Philately for postal history and its youth category and was president of the American Association of Philatelic Exhibitors in whose journal she has written widely on the topic of philatelic exhibiting.
