= Eric W. Cochrane =

Eric Willam Cochrane Jr. (May 13, 1928 – November 29, 1985) was an American academic who specialized in the Italian Renaissance.

Cochrane was from Berkeley, California. He was awarded the Fulbright Scholarship from 1951 to 1953, and completed his doctorate at Harvard University in 1954. Cochrane then taught at Stanford University before serving in the United States Army. Upon his discharge, Cochrane joined the University of Chicago faculty. He was awarded a Guggenheim Fellowship in 1961, and the University of Chicago's Llewellyn John and Harriet Manchester Quantrell Award for Excellence in Undergraduate Teaching in 1965. He fell ill on a train traveling from Florence to Bologna on November 27, 1985, and died. Cochrane was married to Lydia Goodwin Steinway, daughter of Theodore E. Steinway, with whom he had two children, one of whom is famed University of Chicago financial economist John H. Cochrane.
