= John Edge =

British judge in India (1841–1926)

The Right Honourable Sir John Edge KC
- Portrait by Walter Stoneman, 1924

4th Chief Justice of Allahabad High Court
- In office 27 May 1886 – 30 March 1898
- Appointed by: Queen Victoria
- Preceded by: William Comer Petheram
- Succeeded by: Louis Addin Kershaw

Personal details
- Born: 28 July 1841 Queen's County, Ireland
- Died: 30 July 1926 (aged 85) Kensington, London
- Education: Trinity College Dublin (B.A. and LL.B)

Sir John Edge (28 July 1841 – 30 July 1926) was a Chief Justice of the Allahabad High Court, India, during the British Raj era. A member of the Middle Temple, of which he acted for some time as treasurer, he was also appointed a judicial member of the Council of India and a member of the Privy Council.

== Early life ==
John Edge was the only child of Benjamin Booker Edge and his wife, Esther Anne. He was born on 28 July 1841 in Queen's County, Ireland (now County Laois). His family claimed a Saxon origin and had been in Ireland since the Stuart period.

Edge was privately educated prior to attending Trinity College Dublin between 1858 and 1861. He was awarded both B.A. and LL.B. degrees from that institution and was called to the Irish bar in 1864 as a member of the King's Inns in Dublin. Two years later, he was admitted to the English bar by the Middle Temple and proceeded to practise in the north of that country.

== Career ==
In 1886, Edge became a Queen's Counsel, was made a Knight Bachelor and on 27 May 1886 he was appointed as Chief Justice of the high court of the North-Western Provinces, British India. He replaced William Comer Petheram in that role and was based in Allahabad.

Holding office until 1898, Edge proved to be a capable leader of a court that included several other very talented judges. He also demonstrated considerable administrative skills, such as arranging for the codification of the court's rules and, between 1887 and 1893, serving as the first vice-chancellor of the University of Allahabad. He also headed the famine relief committee set up in response to the 1896 famine in India.

In January 1899, after his recent retirement from the Chief Justice role, Edge became a judicial member of the Council of India and retained that role until 1908. It was at this time that he was also elected to the bench of the Middle Temple, of which he served as treasurer in 1919. In 1902, he also served on a Royal Commission that investigated the Boer War and in 1905 was involved in an inquiry that ultimately had a part in the creation of the Court of Criminal Appeal.

Edge became a privy counsellor in January 1909 and in that role he heard many legal appeals from India between 1916 and May 1926, when he retired completely, just short of his 85th birthday.

== Family ==
Edge married Laura Loughborough, the daughter of a solicitor from Surrey in England, in September 1867. The couple had one son and four daughters.

== Death ==
Within months of his retirement, John Edge died suddenly, on 30 July 1926, at his house, 123 Oakwood Court in Kensington, London.

== Arms ==
Coat of arms of John Edge

Notes
Granted to his father 6 May 1859 by Sir John Berard Burke, Ulster King of Arms.
Crest
A reindeer's head couped Proper collared and chained Or and holding in its mouth a trefoil Vert.
Escutcheon
Per fess Sable and Gules an eagled displayed Argent on a chief Or a cinquefoil between two annulets of the second.
Motto
Semper Fidelis

== Bibliography ==
- FitzGerald, S. V. (2004). "Edge, Sir John (1841–1926)". Oxford Dictionary of National Biography. revised Stearn, Roger T. (online ed.). Oxford University Press. doi:10.1093/ref:odnb/32969. (Subscription, Wikipedia Library access or UK public library membership required.)
