= Richard Garth =

The Right Honourable Sir Richard Garth KC
- Sir Richard Garth, 1875

3rd Chief Justice of Calcutta High Court
- In office 6 April 1875 – 26 February 1886
- Appointed by: Queen Victoria
- Preceded by: Rcihard Couch
- Succeeded by: William Comer Petheram

Member of House of Commons
- In office 1866–1868
- Monarch: Queen Victoria
- Preceded by: William Bovill
- Succeeded by: Guildford Onslow
- Constituency: Guildford

Personal details
- Born: Richard Lowndes; 11 May 1820 Morden, Surrey (now south-west London)
- Died: 23 March 1903 (aged 82) Cheniston Gardens, Kensington
- Spouse: Clara Lowndes
- Children: 7 including George Douglas Garth and William Garth
- Parent(s): Reverend Richard Lowndes (father); Mary Lowndes (mother)
- Education: Eton College, Christ Church, Oxford
- Occupation: Lawyer, Politician
- Profession: Barrister

Sir Richard Garth PC KC (11 May 1820 – 23 March 1903) was member of parliament for Guildford from 1866 to 1868 and Chief Justice of Bengal in colonial India from 1875 to 1886.

== Early life ==
Garth was born Richard Lowndes at Morden, Surrey (now south-west London), the son of the Reverend Richard Lowndes (1790 – 30 January 1862) and his wife Mary Lowndes (née Douglas). Rev. Lowndes was, through his mother, the grandson of Richard Garth (d. 1787), Lord of the manor of Morden. On the death of his mother, the Rev. Lowndes inherited the manor and, in accordance with the requirements of his grandfather's will, he changed his and his family's surname to Garth by royal licence in 1837.

Garth was educated at Eton College and matriculated at Christ Church, Oxford in 1838, graduating B.A. in 1842 and M.A. in 1845. He was captain of the university cricket team in 1840 and 1841. He also played for Marylebone Cricket Club, Hampshire and Surrey between 1839 and 1844. He received his MA from Oxford in June 1845.

A student at Lincoln's Inn from 1842, he became a barrister there on 19 November 1847. When his father died in 1862, Garth inherited the manor and its estate at Morden Hall. Garth sold the manor in about 1872. He was also instrumental in the early planning of parts of Raynes Park, on land he owned in the neighbouring parish of Merton.

Garth practised commercial law in London, often appearing at the Guildhall. On 23 July 1866, Garth was made a Queen's Counsel and, two days later, became a bencher of Lincoln's Inn. At a by-election on 17 December 1866, he became one of the two members of parliament for Guildford, Surrey, replacing Sir William Bovill. His period as an MP ended at the 1868 general election when, as a consequence of the 1867 Reform Act, Guildford's second parliamentary seat was abolished.

== In India ==
On 6 April 1875, Garth was made Chief Justice of Bengal. He received a knighthood on 13 May 1875. Garth's legal opinions often brought him into conflict with the Indian and Bengal administrations, particularly with the Viceroy, the Marquess of Ripon, over the Bengal Tenancy Act and the Criminal Procedure Code Amendment Bill (the Ilbert Bill), both of which Garth publicly opposed. In May 1883, Garth sentenced Surendranath Banerjea to two months' imprisonment for libel against another of the high court's judges. He remained in the post at Fort William, Calcutta until 26 February 1886.

Although he had opposed legislation which would have brought the legal rights of whites and Indians closer together, Garth was a supporter of the Indian National Congress and, in 1888, wrote a pamphlet A Few Plain Truths about India in support of the organisation's aims stating, "for myself I have long been persuaded that many of the abuses complained of are real and serious; and that some of the proposed reforms would be not only of advantage to India, but would materially strengthen the hands of the Government."

== Later life and death ==
On 21 February 1888, Garth was appointed a Privy Counsellor. He died on 23 March 1903 at 10 Cheniston Gardens, Kensington, only weeks after his wife.

== Family ==
On 27 June 1847, Garth married his cousin Clara Lowndes (1824–1903), daughter of Loftus Lowndes, QC. Lady Garth died at Cedar House, Cheniston-gardens, on 15 January 1903.

The Garths had seven children:

- Richard Garth, b. 1848
- George Douglas Garth, 1852–1900
- William Garth, b. 1854
- Charles Garth, b. 1870
- Mary Eliza Garth, d. 1932
- Helen Frances Garth
- Evelyn Selina May Garth

Parliament of the United Kingdom
Preceded by Sir William Bovill; Guildford Onslow	Member of Parliament for Guildford; 1866–1868; With: Guildford Onslow	Succeeded by Guildford Onslow (Second seat abolished)
Legal offices
Preceded by Sir Richard Couch	Chief Justice of Bengal; 1875–1886	Succeeded by Sir William Comer Petheram
