= Soichi Ichida =

Japanese philatelist (1910–1986)

- Born: 30 December 1910
- Died: 30 June 1986 (aged 75)
- Engineering career
- Projects: Expert on classic Japanese postage stamps; wrote extensively on the subject
- Awards: Crawford Medal; APS Hall of Fame; Lichtenstein Medal; Lindenberg Medal; Luff Award

Dr. Soichi Ichida (30 December 1910 – 30 June 1986) was a distinguished Japanese philatelist who specialized in studies of classic Japanese postage stamps and encouraged the collecting of Japanese stamps and Japanese postal history throughout the world.

== Philatelic literature ==
Dr. Soichi Ichida wrote extensively on Japanese classic stamps. His works include “The Dragon Stamps of Japan 1871–1872” in 1959, “The Cherry Blossom Issues of Japan 1872–1876” in 1965 and for which he was awarded the Crawford Medal in 1966. He also wrote “The Six Sen Violet Brown Native Paper Stamp 1874.”

== Philatelic activity ==
Soichi Ichida was founding president of the Inter-Asian Philatelic Federation and president of the All-Japan Philatelic Federation.

== Honors and awards ==
Soichi Ichida received numerous recognition for his work. These included the Crawford Medal in 1966, signing the Roll of Distinguished Philatelists in 1971, receiving the Lichtenstein Medal in 1972 and the Lindenberg Medal in 1981. He received the Luff Award in 1984 and was elected to the American Philatelic Society Hall of Fame in 1987.

== See also ==
- Philatelic literature
