= Alfred Lichtenstein (philatelist) =

American philatelist

Alfred F. Lichtenstein
- Born: August 6, 1876
- Died: February 24, 1947 (aged 70); New York City
- Occupation: Chemist
- Children: Louise Boyd Dale (daughter)
- Honors: Roll of Distinguished Philatelists (1927); APS Hall of Fame (1948); Lichtenstein Medal (1952)

Alfred F. Lichtenstein (August 6, 1876 – February 24, 1947) was one of the most famous American philatelists.

== Biography ==
Alfred F. Lichtenstein, born on August 6, 1876, received his education at Brooklyn Polytechnic Institute before pursuing graduate studies in chemistry at the University of Berlin. He initially worked as an assistant chemist for a dyestuff firm, later establishing his own venture, Analine Dyes and Chemicals, in Switzerland.

In 1921, the Society of Chemical Industry in Basle, Switzerland, acquired Lichtenstein's business, merging it into the larger Ciba-Geigy Company. Under his leadership, Ciba-Geigy expanded into pharmaceuticals, medical research, and dye manufacturing. Lichtenstein served as the president of Ciba until his retirement in 1946, at which point he became Chairman of the Board.

== Philately ==
Alfred Lichtenstein's interest in stamp collecting began during his school years in Brooklyn. He gained recognition in the philatelic community in 1917 by acquiring significant portions of the George Worthington Collection, reportedly for $450,000.

Lichtenstein's classic stamp collections were one of the most complete, with a passion for stamps issued before 1870. He collected stamps issued by Canadian provinces and the Confederation of Canada, Switzerland, Cape Colony, Ceylon, Gambia, Mauritius, Argentina and Uruguay. Considering the postal history of the United States, his collection was a reference for "Western Express".

He was an active member of the Collectors Club of New York which was developed by Lichtenstein and his friend Theodore E. Steinway. He was also a member of the Royal Philatelic Society of Canada.

An international philatelic judge during three decades, he was the commissioner of international philatelic exhibitions of 1913, 1926 and 1936 (the last two in New York). When he died, he was preparing the Centenary International Stamp Exhibition (CIPEX) of 1947.

Lichtenstein exhibited the Buenos Aires “barquitos” tete-beche pair at the 1940 exhibition held at The Collectors Club of New York to commemorate 100 years of postage stamps. When he died in New York City in 1947 (also his birthplace) and his daughter, Louise Boyd Dale, continued his philatelic legacy, it was assumed that she had possession of the pair.

In March 1945 in New York City, Theodore Steinway, other philatelists and Lichtenstein founded the Philatelic Foundation. It is a non-profit educational institution whose goals are philatelic expertise, research and publications. After 1947, his daughter Louise Boyd Dale continued to support the foundation.

His stamp collections and those of his daughter were sold during auctions at Harmer's between 1968 and 1971, between 1989 and 1992, and in 1997.

== Tributes ==
In 1927, Alfred Lichtenstein signed the Roll of Distinguished Philatelists, the major British philatelic distinction.

In 1948, the American Philatelic Society added him to its Hall of Fame list of the most important deceased philatelists.

In 1952, the Collectors Club of New York created a philatelic award called the Alfred F. Lichtenstein Memorial Award. Theodore Steinway was the first person to receive this prize for his work in developing philately. In 1996, this club named Lichtenstein "the Outstanding American Philatelist" of the first half of the 20th century.

== Personal life ==
Lichtenstein married Anne Boyd, and they had one child, Louise Boyd Dale, also a philatelist.

== See also ==
- Buenos Aires 1859 1p "In Ps" tete-beche pair
- Ferrer corner block of 15 of the 80 centésimos green 1856 'Diligencia'
