= Tête-bêche =

Opposite orientation of a pair of postage stamps

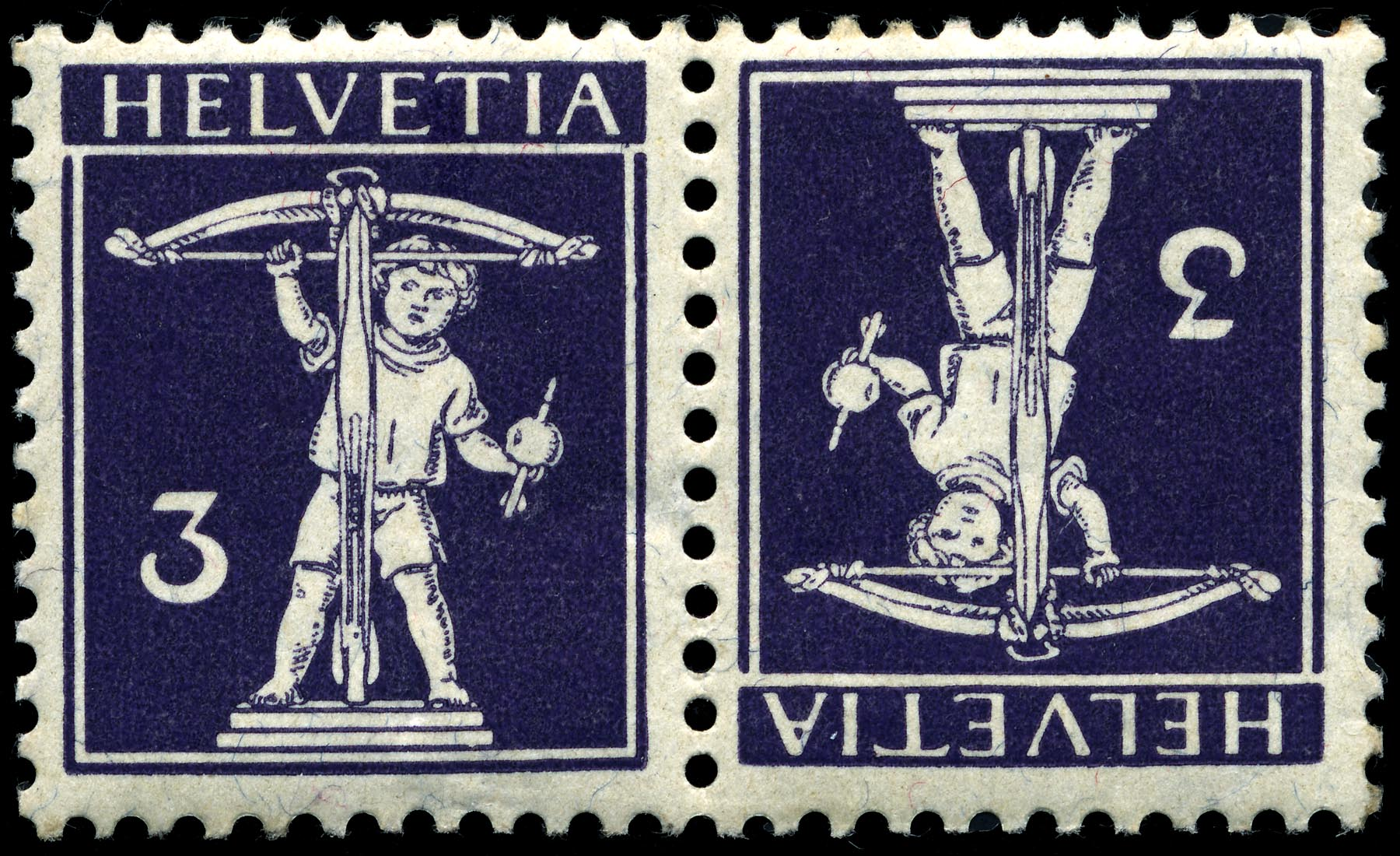
Tête-bêche pairs of the Swiss "William Tell's son" design of 1910 are relatively common.

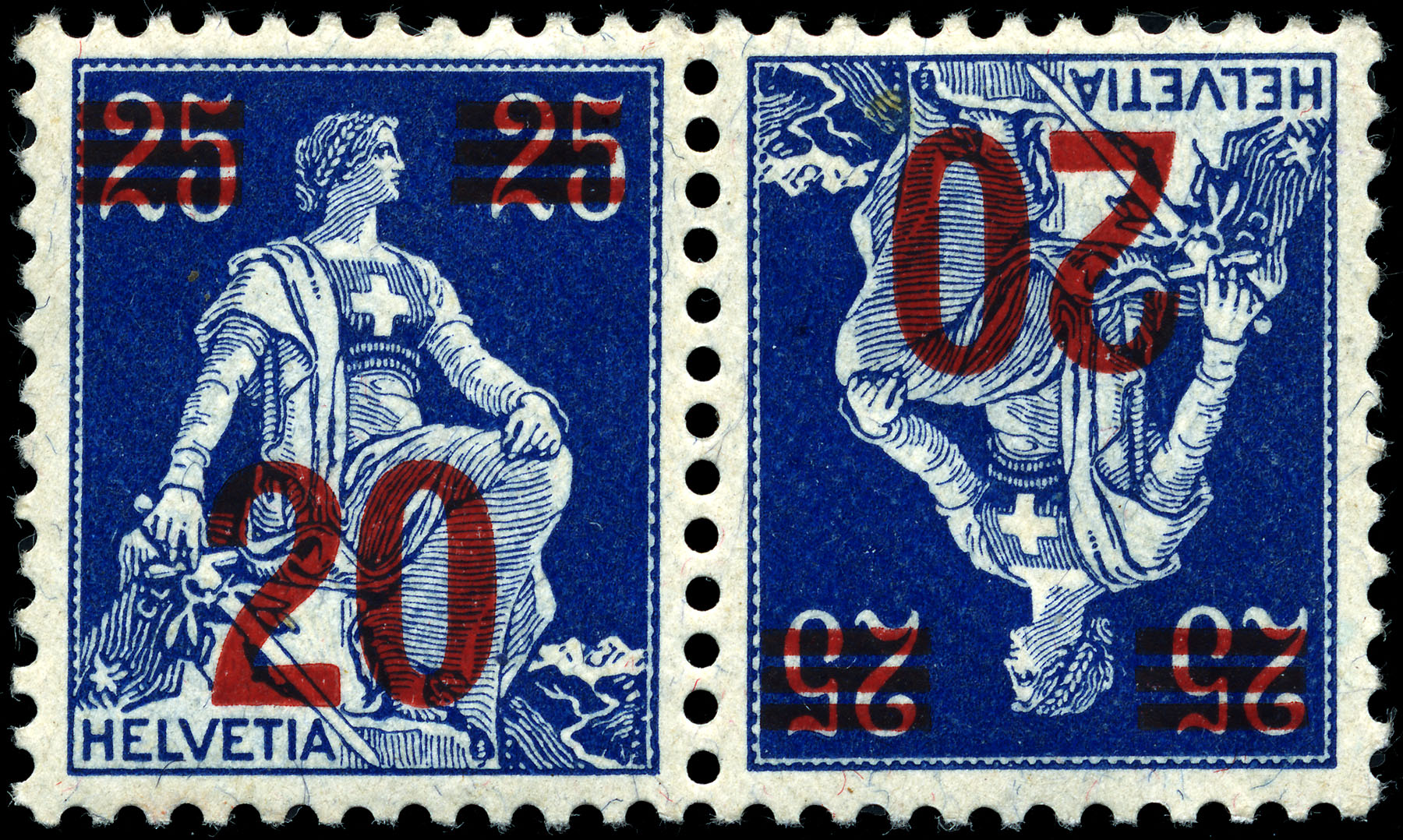
Tête-bêche layout required that the 1921 overprints of Switzerland were arranged to match.

In philately, tête-bêche (French for "head-to-tail", lit. "head-to-head") is a joined pair of stamps in which one is upside-down in relation to the other, produced intentionally or accidentally. Like any pair of stamps, a pair of tête-bêches can be vertical or horizontal. In the case of a pair of triangular stamps, they cannot help but be linked "head-to-tail".

Mechanical errors during the process of production can result in tête-bêches. During the printing of stamps for booklets, the pages of stamps are usually printed in multiples from a larger printing plate. This can result in tête-bêche pairs. Most booklet stamps are printed in sheets, each containing four booklets. Looking at such a sheet two booklets, one above the other, come in from the left with the other two sheets coming from the right which appear to be upside down. Where the columns of stamps from each side meet there is therefore a row of tete-beche pairs. It is unusual for these pairs to find their way into the postal system, as the sheets are cut into individual booklet pages before binding into the distributed booklet. A block of 24 5d Machin stamps, which should have been guillotined into four booklet pages, includes four tête-bêche pairs. This was sold in 1970, in the normal course of business, by the British Post Office and is exhibited by a member of the Royal Mail Stamp Advisory Committee.

== See also ==
- Buenos Aires 1859 1p "In Ps" tete-beche pair
- Rotational symmetry
