= George Wendell Brett =

American philatelist (1912–2005)

- Born: May 30, 1912
- Died: January 14, 2005 (aged 92)
- Engineering career
- Institutions: United States Stamp Society
- Projects: Wrote extensively on postage stamps and other material produced by the Bureau of Engraving and Printing
- Awards: Lichtenstein Medal; APS Hall of Fame; Luff Award

George Wendell Brett (May 30, 1912 – January 14, 2005), of Iowa, was a philatelist who wrote extensively on postage stamps and other material produced by the Bureau of Engraving and Printing and was called ”Mr. BIA” by his colleagues.

== Philatelic literature ==
Brett contributed over five hundred articles to philatelic journals. He authored several books on postage stamps and their printing, including The Giori Press: A Comprehensive Study of Current Stamp Production at the Bureau of Engraving and Printing (1961), and Printing Methods and Techniques in (1985).

== Philatelic activity ==
Brett was active in the philatelic community. He was president of the United States Stamp Society (previously called the Bureau Issues Association) during 1966 and 1967, then continued on as chairman and emeritus chairman until his death. And from 1961 to 1963 he was a member of the Citizens' Stamp Advisory Committee.

== Honors and awards ==
Brett was honored with the Lichtenstein Medal in 1983, the Luff Award for distinguished philatelic research in 1978, and numerous other awards. He was named to the Writers Hall of Fame in 1979 and the American Philatelic Society Hall of Fame in 2006.

== See also ==
- Philately
- Philatelic literature
