= Alan Warren (philatelist) =

American philatelist

Alan Warren FRPSL is an American philatelist who was appointed to the Roll of Distinguished Philatelists in 2019. He has received the Lichtenstein Medal. He is a specialist in the postage stamps and postal history of Scandinavia.
