= Bernard A. Hennig =

American philatelist

Bernard A. Hennig (1917 – 2014) was an American philatelist based in Chicago, who acted as chairman of the 1986 Ameripex international exhibition, held in the Chicago area. His main collecting area was Danzig, including proofs, essays and covers, as well as the stamps of Guatemala. He was added to the Roll of Distinguished Philatelists in 1982. Hennig was awarded the Lichtenstein Medal in 1987. The American Association of Philatelic Exhibitors initiated the Bernard A. Hennig Award in 2007 and he received the first Award. He was inducted into the American Philatelic Society Hall of Fame in 2015.
