= Alberto Diena =

Italian philatelist (1894–1977)

- Born: May 31, 1894
- Died: February 13, 1977 (aged 82)
- Known for: Expert on stamps of Italy; wrote numerous articles on Italian stamps
- Awards: APS Hall of Fame

Alberto Diena (May 31, 1894 – February 13, 1977), of Italy, was an expert on stamps of Italy, its former colonies, and the Italian states of the 19th century. He was the son of his internationally renowned father, Emilio Diena, who was regarded by many as “Italy’s greatest philatelist.”

== Philatelic literature ==
Because of his in-depth knowledge and study of the stamps of Italy, he wrote numerous articles on stamps of Italy, especially the early “classic” issues.

== Philatelic activity ==
Diena was highly regarded by fellow philatelists, both buyers and sellers of stamps, because of his ability to detect counterfeit or fake copies of the early rare Italian postal stamps. His opinion was always held with the highest regard by fellow collectors.

== Honors and awards ==
Diena was named to the American Philatelic Society Hall of Fame in 1978.

== Legacy ==
His son Dr. Enzo Diena continued on with his father's work.

== See also ==
- Philately
- Philatelic literature
