= Association of British Philatelic Societies =

The A.B.P.S. logo.

The Association of British Philatelic Societies, commonly known as the ABPS, is the British national association of philatelic societies, regional philatelic federations, and specialist philatelic societies.

== Aims ==
The aims of the ABPS are:

- To represent the hobby both nationally and internationally.
- To encourage the growth of philately.
- To support events and, if required, offer support and advice to Federations/Society events.
- To provide workshops locally or nationally on various aspects of the hobby.
- To provide a directory which serves as a compendium of information useful to the Society Secretary and its members.
- To publish books, papers, etc., of value to the members.
- To assist in the organisation of an annual congress which acts as a national focus for philately within the British Isles.
- To issue at least 4 times a year a journal, ABPS News, which publicises the work of affiliated Federations and Societies at a local and national level and reports on developments within philatelic. (sic)
- To work with the International bodies in the creation of regulations for competitive entries.

== Activities ==
Each year, the ABPS holds the Philatelic Congress of Great Britain. The first congress was in 1909. At the congress, the Congress Medal is presented, and the new signatories to the Roll of Distinguished Philatelists sign the Roll. Awards of Merit are also made.

A quarterly journal, ABPS News, is published, and the ABPS closely supports the Stamp Active Network, which aims to promote youth philately in Britain.

Grosvenor Philatelic Auctions and Stanley Gibbons are dealer patrons of the association.

== Legal status and governance ==
The ABPS is incorporated as The Association of British Philatelic Societies Limited, a company limited by guarantee registered at Companies House. A subsidiary, A.B.P.S. Exhibitions Limited, organises philatelic exhibitions.

An executive committee runs the association.
