= Vincent Graves Greene =

Canadian philatelist

- Born: February 11, 1893
- Died: July 22, 1988 (aged 95)
- Engineering career
- Projects: Co-authored The Postal History of Nova Scotia and New Brunswick, 1754-1867; chaired CAPEX three times.
- Awards: Lichtenstein Medal; APS Hall of Fame

Vincent Graves Greene (February 11, 1893 – July 22, 1988) was a Canadian philatelist, so prominent in the field of Canadian philately that he was often referred to as “Canada's Grand Old Man” by fellow philatelists.

== Philatelic literature ==
Greene specialized in collecting postage stamps of Canada and the Canadian provinces and, in 1964, he and C. M. Jephcott and J. H. M. Young co-authored the book The Postal History of Nova Scotia and New Brunswick, 1754-1867.

== Philatelic activity ==
Greene was very active in Canadian philately and was appointed chairman of CAPEX, the Canadian Philatelic Exposition, in 1951, 1978, and 1987. He participated in most of the major Canadian stamp societies, and international ones as well.

== Honors and awards ==
Greene signed the Roll of Distinguished Philatelists in 1963, received the Lichtenstein Medal in 1964. and was admitted to the American Philatelic Society Hall of Fame in 1989.

== Legacy ==
Greene established the Vincent Graves Greene Philatelic Foundation at Toronto in 1975.

== See also ==
- Philatelic literature
