= Barwis =

Barwis is a surname. Notable people with the surname include:

- John H. Barwis, American philatelist
- Richard Barwis (1601–1648), English politician
