= Gilbert Harrison (rugby) =

England international rugby union player & philatelist

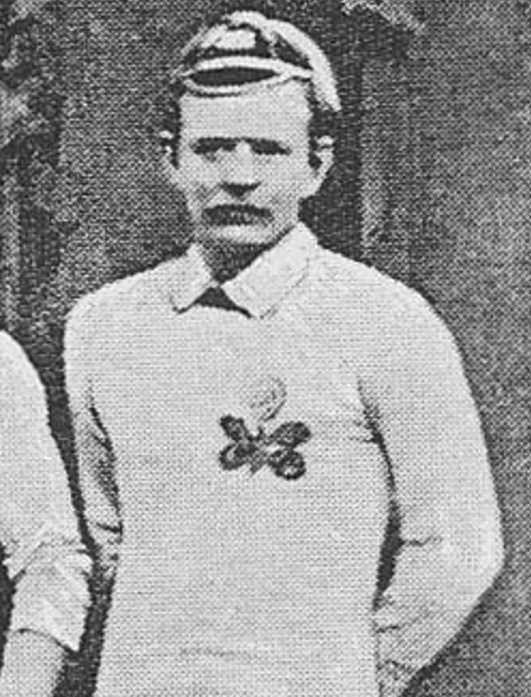
- Full name: Gilbert Harrison
- Born: 13 June 1858 Cottingham, East Riding of Yorkshire, England
- Died: 9 November 1894 (aged 36) Sculcoates, East Riding of Yorkshire, England

Rugby union career
- Position: Forwards
Senior career
| Years | Team | Apps | (Points) |
| – | Hull FC | | |
| – | Yorkshire Wanderers | | |
International career
| Years | Team | Apps | (Points) |
| 1877-85 | England | 7 | (0) |

Gilbert "Gillie" Harrison (13 June 1858 – 9 November 1894) was an English philatelist, and rugby union footballer who played in the 1870s and 1880s. He was one of the "Fathers of Philately" entered on the Roll of Distinguished Philatelists in 1921.

== Birth ==
Harrison was born in Cottingham, East Riding of Yorkshire, England.

== Rugby ==
Harrison played at representative level for England, and at club level was captain for Hull FC, as a forward, e.g. front row, lock, or back row. Before Thursday 29 August 1895, Hull F.C. was a rugby union club.

Gillie Harrison won caps for England while at Hull F.C. in 1877 against Ireland, and Scotland, in 1879 against Scotland, and Ireland, in 1880 against Scotland, and in 1885 against Wales, and Ireland.

== Philately ==
He joined The Philatelic Society, London, now The Royal Philatelic Society London, in February 1889 and was an expert on the stamps of Afghanistan, Portuguese India, Kashmir, and on United States postal stationery. It was reported in The London Philatelist that Harrison had spent over £4500 on his United States stamped envelope collection alone but still lacked many varieties. He won a gold medal at the London Philatelic Exhibition 1890 for his display of US stamped envelopes.

He died on 9 November 1894, at Ferriby (Sculcoates), at the age of 36.

His notes for a work on the early postage stamps of Afghanistan, uncompleted at the time of his death, were handed to Edward Denny Bacon and the book was eventually published by the Philatelic Society of India as The Postage Stamps of Afghanistan.

== Publications ==
- Portuguese India. London: Stanley Gibbons, 1893. (With Lieut. F. H. Napier, R.N.) Reprinted from articles in Stanley Gibbons' Monthly Journal.
- The Nesbitt Stamped Envelopes and Wrappers of the United States of America. A supplement to The London Philatelist, Volume IV, 1895, compiled by Harrison and edited and completed by Edward Denny Bacon.
