= John Walter Scott =

American stamp dealer (1845–1919)

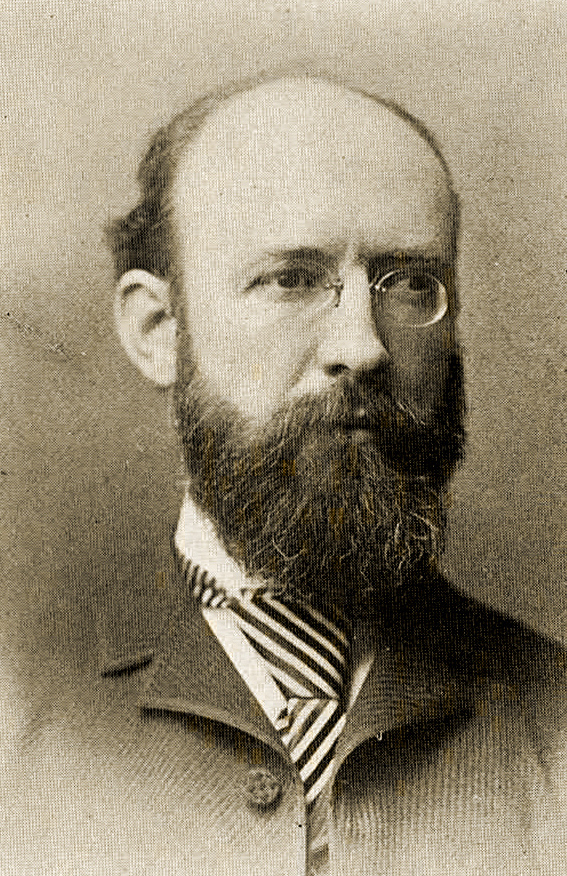
- Scott in 1877
- Born: November 2, 1845
- Died: January 4, 1919 (aged 73)
- Organizations: Collectors Club of New York; American Philatelic Society
- Known for: Created the first Scott catalog; conducted the first stamp auction; America's first major stamp dealer
- Children: Walter Stone Scott
- Awards: APS Hall of Fame

John Walter Scott (November 2, 1845 – January 4, 1919) of New York City, was originally from England, but he emigrated to the United States to take part in the California Gold Rush. Unsuccessful at the prospecting trade, Scott began to sell postage stamps for collectors and in a short period of time became the nation's leading stamp dealer. During his lifetime, he was known as "The Father of American Philately" by his fellow stamp collectors.

== Philatelic literature ==
Scott published the first significant stamp journal in America in 1868, entitled American Journal of Philately. Also, in 1868, he issued his first multi-paged postage stamp catalog, A Descriptive Catalogue of America and Foreign Postage Stamps, Issued from 1840 to Date. In a short period of time, his Scott catalog became the leading stamp catalog in the United States. In 1885, he sold the rights to his business to the Calman brothers who renamed it the Scott Stamp and Coin Company.

Scott continued his stamp business after a legal battle over the use of his name (which he won) and continued publishing philatelic literature, such as The Metropolitan Philatelist, the J. W. Scott & Co., Ltd. Weekly News Letter, and the John W. Scott's Junior Weekly Letter, later renamed the John W. Scott's Weekly Bulletin.

In 1869 he issued his first stamp album with spaces for specially printed labels showing world leaders and himself.

== Philatelic auctions ==
Scott was innovative in business methods, and conducted the first postage stamp auction ever held (May 28, 1870, in New York City). This was a success and he continued to organize and conduct auctions in the United States and in Europe. He also was the first, in 1882, to issue an auction catalog with full color plates of the stamps on sale. He was also the first to sell a postage stamp to collectors for over one thousand dollars.

== Philatelic activity ==
Scott was active in organizing philatelic exhibitions and, in general, "selling" the stamp collecting hobby. He was one of the founding members of the Collectors Club of New York (1896) and active in the American Philatelic Society where he was president from 1917 to 1919.

== Vegetarianism ==
Scott was a vegetarian. In 1910, it was noted that "for more than 30 years he has been a vegetarian and a strong advocate of the no midday-meal plan."

Scott was President of the New York Vegetarian Society.

== Legacy ==
Scott was named to the American Philatelic Society Hall of Fame in 1941.

The continued existence and growth of the Scott catalog used by American stamp collectors assures Scott's legacy.

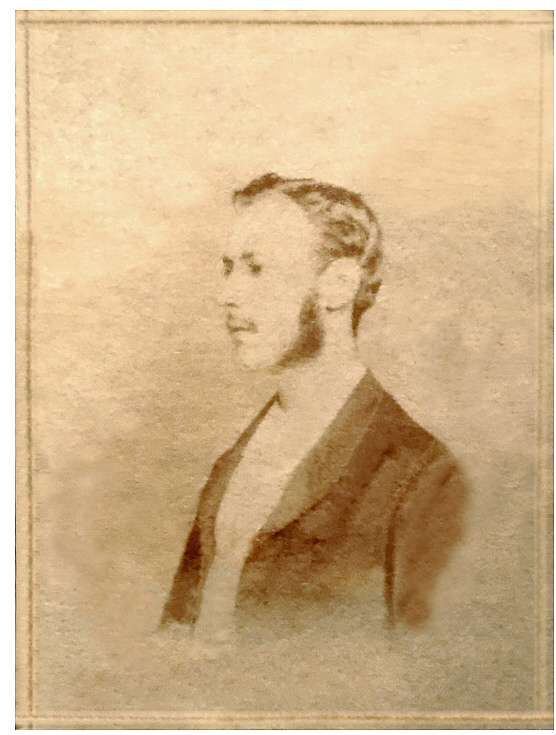
Portrait of Scott used on a label produced for his stamp album of 1869

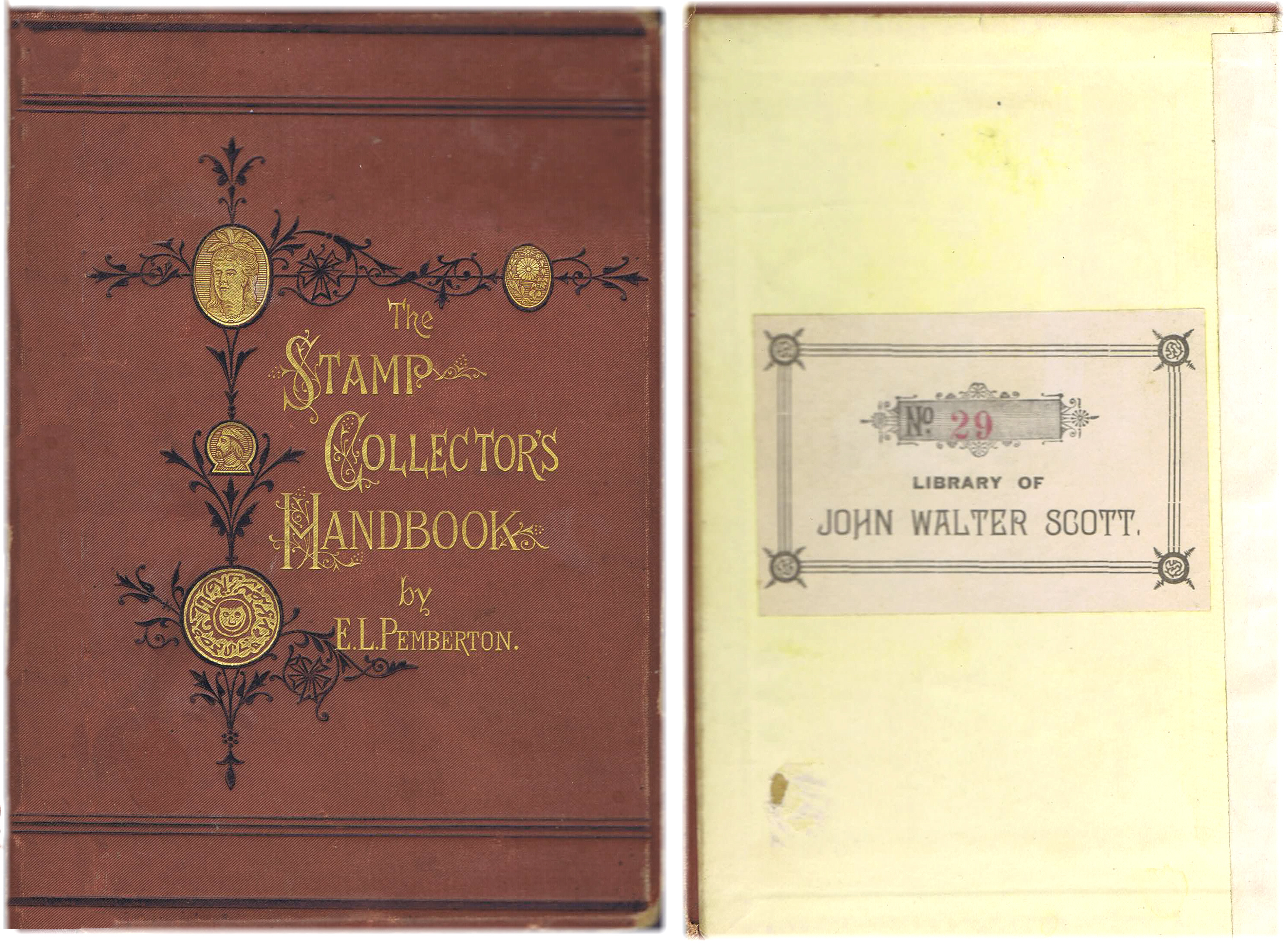
Scott's own Pemberton stamp catalog containing his hand written notations

== Scott Articles ==
Scott Biography by Chittenden

Scott In Philatelic Literature Chrittenden
