= Walter Stone Scott =

- Born: February 17, 1871
- Died: October 29, 1948 (aged 77)
- Parent: John Walter Scott (father)
- Engineering career
- Projects: New York City auctioneer of postage stamps and postal history items; highly regarded appraiser of philatelic lots
- Awards: APS Hall of Fame

Walter Stone Scott (February 17, 1871 – October 29, 1948) was an American auctioneer of postage stamps and postal history items. He was the son of philatelist John Walter Scott.

== Philatelic activity ==
Walter Scott started his business of selling rare postage stamps in New York City during the 1890s. During the years 1896 to 1898 he amassed sufficient lots of philatelic material to conduct twelve auctions on his own.

After 1900, Walter Scott became a free-lance auctioneer, offering his services to many auction houses in New York City. He was a popular auctioneer, and, it is said that he “sold more lots of stamps than any other auctioneer.”

Scott was an expert on rare stamps and was often asked to evaluate rare stamps or appraise collections before sale. He was highly regarded for his integrity, and reviewed and appraised the collections in the estates of various famous philatelists. In the case of his evaluation and appraisal of the massive collection of the deceased philatelist, E. H. R. Green, after evaluating the material, Walter Scott arranged for its sale through twenty nine auctions, from 1942 to 1946.

== Honors and awards ==
Walter Scott was named to the American Philatelic Society Hall of Fame in 1950.

== See also ==
- Philately
