= Douglas Garth =

British lawyer

Douglas Garth (15 May 1852 – 6 January 1900) was a British philatelist who was one of the "Fathers of Philately" entered on the Roll of Distinguished Philatelists in 1921. He was an expert on the stamps of India and British Guiana and a Solicitor in the firm of Pemberton & Garth. Garth was the second son of Sir Richard Garth (1820–1903), a former Chief-Justice of Bengal.

== Philately ==
Garth was Honorary Secretary from 1888 to 1894 of the Philatelic Society, London, now The Royal Philatelic Society London, and a member of the first Publications Committee of that society. He was on the committee of the London Philatelic Exhibition 1890, where he won a gold medal for his display of India and Ceylon. He was credited by The London Philatelist with introducing the modern stamp auction to Britain, the first such auction being held by Thomas Bull (1839–1905) at 77 Chancery Lane on 24 November 1888.

In 1891, Garth gave a display to the society of the First Issues of India and in 1896 he displayed Straits Settlements Stamps. In 1892, he gave evidence against the stamp forgers Benjamin and Sarpy. Garth's involvement in organised philately began to wane, however, as his health worsened in the late 1890s and he died, at Old Headington, Oxford, on 6 January 1900 of influenza followed by bronchitis. He was survived by his wife and five children.

== Publications ==
- Garth, Douglas (1896), Notes on Straits Settlements Stamps. A paper read before the Philatelic Society, London, on the 15th May, 1896., vol. V, The London Philatelist, pp. 339–341
