= Enzo Diena =

Italian philatelist (1927–2000)

- Born: March 23, 1927
- Died: January 20, 2000 (aged 72)
- Awards: Lichtenstein Medal; APS Hall of Fame; Luff Award; Lindenberg Medal

Enzo Diena (March 23, 1927 – January 20, 2000) was an Italian philatelist who continued the tradition of his father Alberto Diena and grandfather Emilio Diena in dedicating himself to the study of Italian stamps.

== Career ==
Diena collected Italian postage stamps especially the early classic stamps of Italy and the Italian States of the 19th century. He was the editor of various philatelic publications, such as the Italia Filatelica, which later merged and became La Settimana del Collezionista to form Il Collezionista - Italia Filatelica. Diena worked with a number of catalogers of Italian stamps and wrote extensively on the stamps of Italy and Italian states.

Diena served on a number of international philatelic juries over a career of forty years.

His knowledge of Italian philately was recognized by the Italian post office, which led to his becoming admitted to the Philatelic Committee of the Italian Ministry of Posts.

== Honors and awards ==
Diena signed the Golden Roll of Italian Philately in 1967, signed the Roll of Distinguished Philatelists in 1977, and received the Lichtenstein Medal in 1978. He was awarded the Luff Award in 1981 for Exceptional Contributions to Philately and the Lindenberg Medal in 1984. He was named to the American Philatelic Society Hall of Fame in 2001.

== See also ==
- Philatelic literature
