= Nils Strandell =

Swedish philatelist

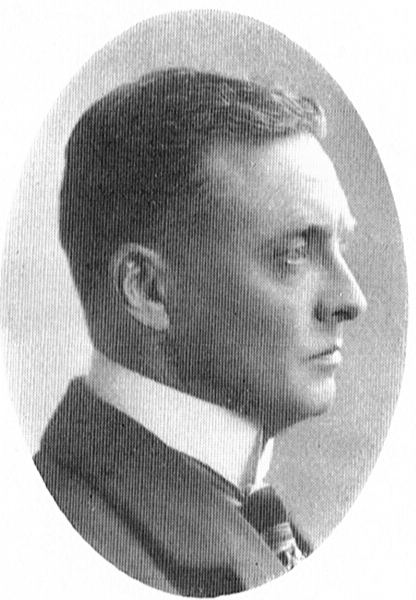
Image of Nils Strandell

Nils Strandell (20 May 1876 – 20 or 28 July 1963) was a Swedish philatelist who signed the Roll of Distinguished Philatelists in 1922. He was President of Honour at the STOCKHOLMIA 55 stamp exhibition.
