= Carroll Chase =

Philatelic expert (1878–1960)

Dr. Carroll Chase
- Born: September 17, 1878
- Died: May 11, 1960 (aged 81)
- Occupation: Medical Doctor
- Known for: Plating of early United States and French stamps
- Honors: Crawford Medal (1930); Lindenberg Medal (1932); Luff Award (1944); Lichtenstein Medal (1954); APS Hall of Fame (1960)

Carroll Chase (17 September 1878–11 May 1960) was an internationally recognized philatelic expert who specialized in classic stamps of the United States and France. In his effort to study classic French stamps, he traveled to France and remained there until 1941, when he returned to the United States.

== Philatelic accomplishments ==
Chase was responsible for:

- complete plating of the U.S. three-cent 1851-57 issue
- plating of the French 25-centime 1871 issue
- co-author of The First Hundred Years of Territorial Postmarks 1787–1887 (1950)
- The Smithsonian Institution has the photographic negatives of Dr. Carroll Chase's reconstructed plates of the U.S. three-cent 1851 issue. The Chase prints show each stamp in the same size as the original stamp. Each image shows a complete pane of stamps and measures 11 x 14 inches. The reconstruction includes 13 plates consisting of a left and a right pane, making a total of 26 panes.

== Philatelic leadership ==
Chase was active in supporting philately. He:

- was vice president of the American Philatelic Society in 1915–1917
- was president of the American Philatelic Society in 1920–1922
- signed the Roll of Distinguished Philatelists in 1921

== Honors ==
Chase was internationally recognized and awarded a number of honors:

- Crawford Medal in 1930
- Lindenberg Medal in 1932
- Luff Award in 1944
- Lichtenstein Medal in 1954
- Elected to the American Philatelic Society Hall of Fame in 1960

== See also ==
- Philately
- Philatelic literature
- Lindenberg Medal

== References and sources ==
Sources

- Carroll Chase
