= Richard F. Winter =

American philatelist

Richard Farnum Winter is an American philatelist who signed the Roll of Distinguished Philatelists in 2008.
