= José Marcó del Pont =

- Born: c. 1851
- Died: 11 July 1917
- Occupation: Philatelist

Dr. José Marcó del Pont (c. 1851 – 11 July 1917) was a philatelist who was one of the "Fathers of Philately" entered on the Roll of Distinguished Philatelists in 1921.
