= John H. Barwis =

American philatelist

- Occupation: Philatelist

John H. Barwis is an American philatelist who signed the Roll of Distinguished Philatelists in 2020. He is also the 2020 recipient of the Lichtenstein Medal.

In 2018, he received the Luff Award for Distinguished Philatelic Research.
