= Herbert J. Bloch =

American philatelist

- Born: November 21, 1907
- Died: September 7, 1987 (aged 79)
- Engineering career
- Institutions: Philatelic Foundation
- Projects: Chairman of the expert committee of the Philatelic Foundation; describer at important philatelic auctions
- Awards: Lindenberg Medal; APS Hall of Fame; Luff Award; Neinken Award

Herbert J. Bloch (November 21, 1907 – September 7, 1987), who emigrated from Europe to New York City in 1936, was a philatelist and stamp dealer who became recognized as a leading expert on authentication of rare European postage stamps.

== Collecting interests ==
Bloch, who was also a stamp dealer, specialized in Europe and built up some valuable collections of stamps for himself and his clients.

== Philatelic activity ==
During World War II Herbert Bloch joined the H. R. Harmer organization and was the describer at auctions of the stamps of prominent collectors, such as the collection of stamps accumulated by President Franklin D. Roosevelt during the president's lifetime.

Bloch was a member of the Friedl Expert Committee which specialized in the expertizing of rare European stamps. He later served as chairman of the expert committee of the Philatelic Foundation. And, in 1956, he joined the Mercury Stamp Company.

== Honors and awards ==
Because of his expertise and activity within the philatelic world, Bloch was awarded a number of honors. These included signing the Roll of Distinguished Philatelists in 1968, being awarded the Luff Award for Exceptional Contributions to Philately in 1968, receiving the “Outstanding Philatelist" award by Scott Publishing Company in 1978, being awarded the Neinken Award in 1986 and the Lindenberg Medal in 1986. In 1988 Bloch was elected to the American Philatelic Society Hall of Fame.

== See also ==
- Philatelic literature
