= Mario Diena =

Italian philatelist

Dr. Mario Diena (6 July 1891 – 4 November 1971) was an Italian philatelist who was added to the Roll of Distinguished Philatelists in 1956.
