= U.S. Philatelic Classics Society =

The U.S. Philatelic Classics Society
- Type: not-for-profit organization
- Purpose: encouragement of philatelic research
- Location: State of Indiana, USA
- Origins: The Three Cent 1851-57 Unit of the American Philatelic Society
- Region served: Worldwide
- Method: preparation and distribution of philatelic literature and periodicals
- Key people: Wade E. Saadi
- Website: The U.S. Philatelic Classics Society

The U.S. Philatelic Classics Society (USPCS) is a society dedicated to the study of United States postal issues and postal history from the Stampless era up to 1900.

== History ==
The society evolved from the Three Cent 1851-57 Unit of the American Philatelic Society. Its founding members include such famous philatelists as Dr. Carroll Chase, Stanley Bryan Ashbrook, and Leo J. Shaughnessy.

== Meetings ==
The society holds annual meetings.

== The Chronicle of the U.S. Classic Postal Issues ==
The society publishes its journal The Chronicle of the U.S. Classic Postal Issues on a quarterly basis. The society also publishes a bulletin entitled Chairman’s Chatter.

== Awards ==
The society offers a variety of awards for philatelic achievements. These include the Ashbrook Cup, the Chase Cup, the Perry Cup, the Brookman cup, the Mortimer L. Neinken Award, and the Susan M. McDonald Award.

== Organization ==
The USPCS is governed by a set of by-laws, and is administered by a board of directors, president, vice president, secretary, assistant secretary, treasurer, and a number of officers with assigned responsibilities.

== See also ==
- Postage stamps and postal history of the United States
