= Rowland Hill Awards =

Philatelic award

The Rowland Hill Awards were established in 1997 as a joint venture between Britain's Royal Mail, the British Philatelic Trust and the Association of British Philatelic Societies.

The awards are named after the noted Victorian postal reformer Sir Rowland Hill and were last given in 2006 for 2005 winners. The awards have not been made since then and the scheme appears to be dormant.

They are not connected with the Rowland Hill Award given by the Southeast Federation of Stamp Clubs in the United States.

== Aims ==
The aim of the awards is to "encourage and reward fresh ideas which help promote Philately".

== Categories ==
There are three top-level categories of awards, and each has several sub-categories.

- The Royal Mail Awards for Innovation
- The British Philatelic Trust Awards for Initiative
- The Philatelic Traders Society Awards for Enterprise
