= August Dietz =

American philatelist, editor and publisher (1869–1963)

August A. Dietz, Sr.
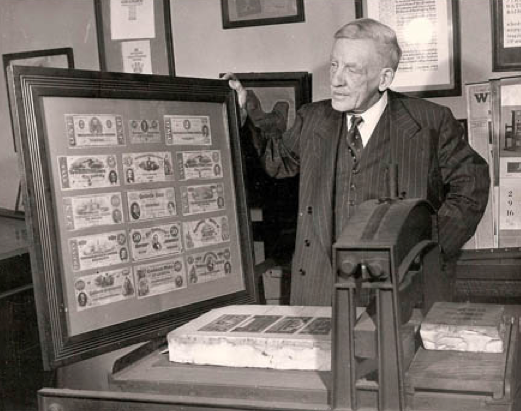
- August Dietz with Confederate Printing Press
- Born: October 19, 1869
- Died: September 26, 1963 (aged 93); Richmond, Virginia
- Engineering career
- Projects: study of mail and postal history of the Confederate States of America

August Dietz (October 19, 1869 – September 26, 1963) was a philatelist, editor and publisher, who specialized in the study of mail and postal history of the Confederate States of America.

== Early life ==
Dietz was born in Prussia on October 19, 1869. He moved to Richmond, Virginia, in the United States in 1871, and began his collecting of postage stamps in 1888.

He died September 26, 1963, in Richmond, Virginia.

== Philatelic career ==
Because he was a trained lithographer and typographer, and because he had access to some of the postal sources of the Confederate States of America, he became interested in the postage and philatelic history of the Confederate States.

Today he is regarded as the Father of Confederate Philately.

He established himself in Richmond at 900 West Clay Street, Station A, Richmond, Virginia.

== Editor and publisher ==
In 1896, Dietz became the editor of The Virginia Philatelist, a monthly philatelic magazine published in Richmond. He formed his own printing company, called the Dietz Printing Company, in 1901. In 1924, he began writing articles on Confederate philately and eventually became the editor of the journals The Southern Philatelist (1924-1929) and The New Southern Philatelist (1929-1933).

== Writings ==
Dietz was considered an expert in Confederate philately and wrote widely on the subject. Some of his studies included:

- The engraver of the Five Cents De La Rue (1941)
- The South's "Way of Life" - Random Notes for the Student of Confederates (1944)
- The Confederate States Post-Office Department, its stamps & stationery (1948)
- Dietz Confederate States Catalog and Handbook, (1931, expanded and reissued in 1937, 1945, and 1959, expanded and published in 1986 as Specialized Catalog of the Postage Stamps of the Confederate States of America.)
- Stamp and Cover Collecting (1933–36)
- Stamp and Cover Collectors Review (1937–39)
- The Postal Service of the Confederate States of America (1939)

== Honors ==
Dietz received numerous honors including:

- 1938 – awarded the Lindenberg Medal by the Berlin Philatelic Club
- 1940 – awarded the first Luff Award by the American Philatelic Society for Exceptional Contributions to Philately
- 1948 – awarded the honorary title of “General” by Confederate Stamp Alliance
- 1955 – awarded the Lichtenstein Medal by the Collectors Club of New York
- 1964 - inducted into the American Philatelic Society Hall of Fame

== The August Dietz Award ==
The August Dietz Award is named in honor of the Founding Father and first President (1935–1939) of the Confederate Stamp Alliance. It is presented for distinguished research and writing in the field of Confederate philately. From 1962 through 1978 the award was presented for articles printed in the Confederate Philatelist. After 1978, the criteria were modified to include any article or publication in the field of Confederate philately.

== See also ==
- Postage stamps and postal history of the Confederate States
- Presidents of the United States on U.S. postage stamps, Civil War era
- Philately
- Philatelic literature
- The Stamp Specialist
