= William Garth (barrister) =

Sir William Garth KC (26 August 1854 – 20 February 1923 London) was an English bibliophile, lawyer and administrator in Calcutta and notable friend and collector of the works of Rudyard Kipling.

Son of Sir Richard Garth, William Garth was educated at Eton and at Merton College, Oxford, graduating BA in 1876. He was called to the bar at the Middle Temple in 1877, was an advocate of the High Court, Calcutta from 1885 to 1913, and was appointed King's Counsel in 1919. He was knighted in 1914.

On his death his valuable collection of books was sold by Sotheby's. His scrap book of items and articles relating to Kipling is held in the Kipling Collection at Dalhousie University, in Halifax, Nova Scotia.
