= Theodore E. Steinway =

American businessman and philatelist (1883–1957)

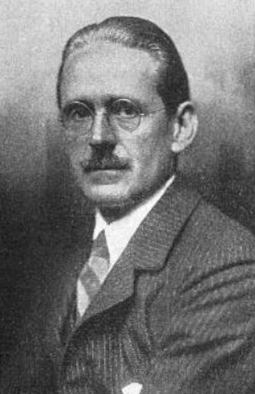
- In the Music Trade Indicator, February 4, 1928
- Born: October 6, 1883; New York City, US
- Died: April 8, 1957 (aged 73); New York City, US
- Education: St. Paul's School
- Organization: Steinway & Sons
- Board member of: Collectors Club of New York; Philatelic Foundation
- Children: 6, including Henry Z. Steinway
- Relatives: Henry E. Steinway (grandfather)
- Awards: Lichtenstein Medal

Theodore Edwin Steinway (October 6, 1883 – April 8, 1957), of the Steinway piano family, was a member of the Collectors Club of New York and board of trustees of the Philatelic Foundation. He was awarded the first Lichtenstein Medal in 1952 for his efforts in the field of philately as well as his contributions to the growth and prestige of the Collectors Club.

== Early life ==
Steinway was born on October 6, 1883, in New York City. He was the grandson of Henry E. Steinway, the founder of Steinway & Sons. His parents had several children, including:

- William R. Steinway
- Theodore Edwin Steinway
- Maude Paige Steinway

Steinway attended the St. Paul's School in Garden City, New York.

== Philanthropy ==
Steinway supported the Collectors Club with funds for various projects, such as purchasing the philatelic library of Austrian Justice Viktor Suppantschitsch for the club. The development of this library resulted in the club having one of the most extensive philatelic libraries in the world.

Steinway, along with other prominent American philatelists, helped found the Philatelic Foundation, which originally was located on the fourth floor of the Collectors Club of New York. He was named chairman of the Expert Committee (1950–1952)..

He was also the founder of the Association for Stamp Exhibitions and was responsible for organizing the first five philatelic international exhibits in the United States which were held in 1913, 1926, 1936, 1947 and 1956.

=== Stamp collections ===
Steinway had various collections of stamps. The most significant ones were:

- specialized study of the "Sydney Views" of New South Wales
- Hamburg and old German States
- stamps with "socked-on-the-nose" cancellations
- stamps and covers relating to his family piano business

Because of his interest in collecting stamps related to his business, and because he applied no rigid rules as to collecting stamps, Steinway is often regarded as one of the founders of thematic collecting, which today is a common method of collecting. Such collectors today collect stamps showing butterflies, elephants, Disney characters, famous art, and so on.

== Personal life ==
He married Ruth Gardner Davis, with whom he had:

- Theodore D. Steinway (1914–1982)
- Henry Ziegler Steinway (1915–2008)
- Frederick Steinway (1921-2004)
- John H. Steinway (1917–1989)
- Elizabeth Steinway (1925–1993), who married Schuyler Chapin (1923–2009)
  - Henry Burden Chapin
  - Theodore Steinway Chapin
  - Samuel Garrison Chapin, who married Caroline Shippen Davis in 1982
  - Miles Chapin (b. 1954)
- Lydia Goodwin Steinway (1927–2016), who married Eric W. Cochrane (1928–1985)

Because of his extensive interests and leadership within the field of philately, Theodore E. Steinway was awarded the first Lichtenstein Medal by the Collectors Club of New York in 1952. His son John carried on his work in the field of philately, and served on the Board of Trustees of The Philatelic Foundation after his death in 1957.
