= John J. Britt =

American philatelist

- Britt, seated at right at the Hollywood Stamp Club in Florida.
- Born: November 11, 1900
- Died: February 6, 1980 (aged 79)
- Occupation: Philatelist
- Awards: Lichtenstein Medal (1961)

John J. Britt (November 11, 1900 – February 6, 1980) was an American philatelist. He was a member (and president between 1953 and 1954) of the Collectors Club of New York. He was awarded the Lichtenstein Medal in 1961 for his contributions to philately.

== Philatelic literature ==
John Britt authored various studies including:

- French Colonial Semi-Postal Air Mail Proofs of the "French State" (Vichy)

== Retirement ==
John Britt, a past president of the Collectors Club of New York, retired to Florida. In 1969, he and seven other philatelists reorganized a tiny stamp club of only a dozen members into the Hollywood Stamp Club in Hollywood, Florida, one of the largest and most active stamp clubs in the nation. He was elected Chairman of the Board of the Hollywood Stamp Club, a post he retained for many years in the 1960s and 1970s.

== See also ==
- Philately
- Philatelic literature
