= Philatelic Congress of Great Britain =

Industry conference

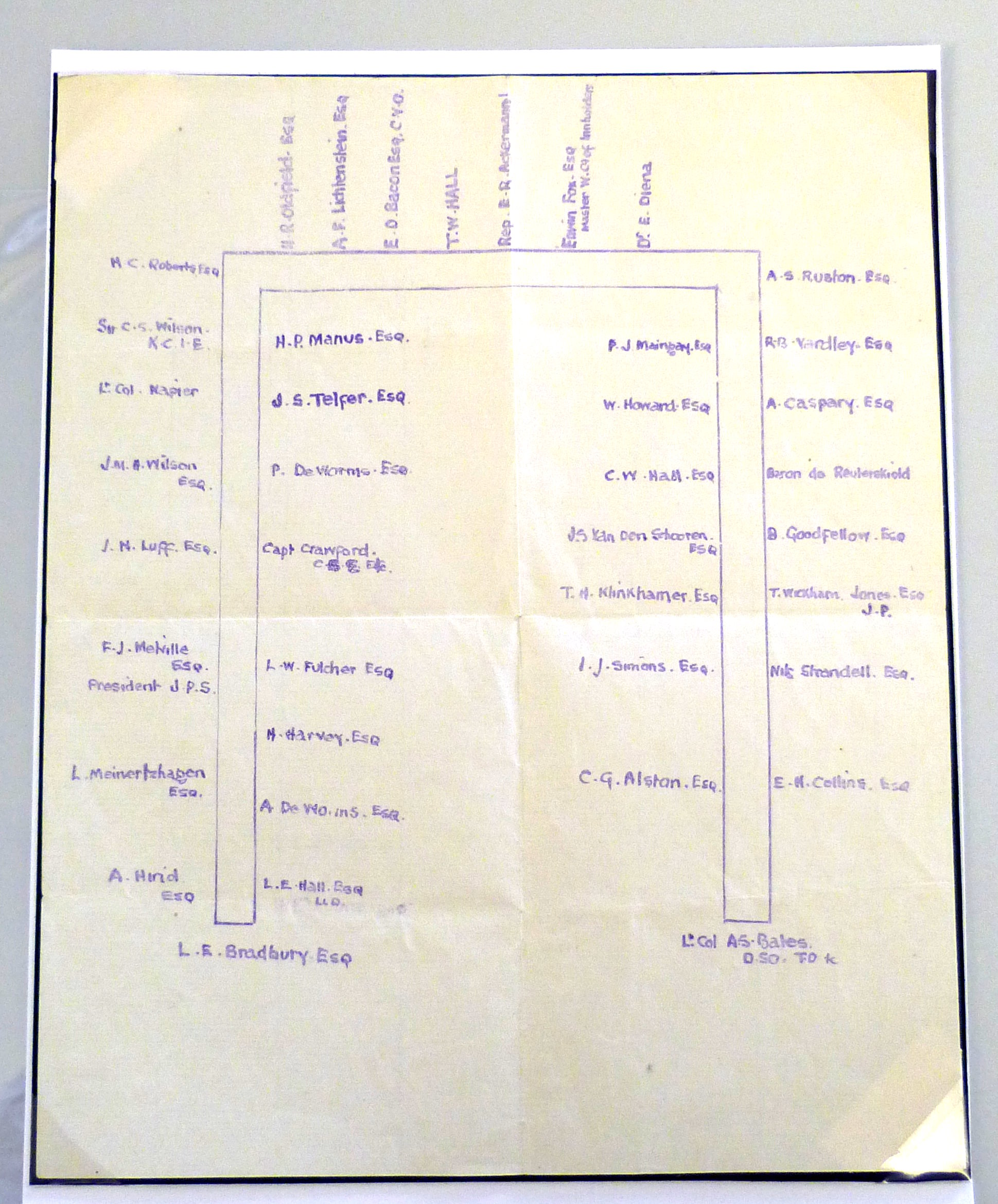
The seating plan for the Royal Philatelic Society London dinner at the 10th Philatelic Congress of Great Britain, 1923.

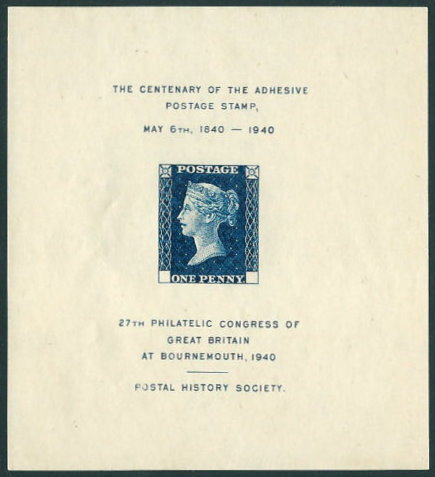
Souvenir sheet issued for the 27th congress at Bournemouth, 1940, by the Postal History Society.

The Philatelic Congress of Great Britain is a national congress held each year by the Association of British Philatelic Societies (ABPS).

== History ==
The first Congress was held in 1909 in conjunction with a stamp exhibition at Hulme Town Hall in Manchester. They continue to this day, each year in a different location.

The business of the first Congress included the formation of a National Society or Federation, the desirability of a Collectors’ Catalogue, unnecessary issues, deceased collector’s stamps and an encyclopaedia of philatelic literature.

== Proceedings ==
The Congress is an opportunity for philatelists to network, view displays and attend the Congress Banquet.

Each year a Congress Medal is presented and the new signatories to the Roll of Distinguished Philatelists sign the Roll.

Papers are given on philatelic subjects, for instance at the 88th Congress in 2006 David Beech of the British Library gave a paper on "The Philately of the Edwardian era as shown in its literature".

== Congress Medal ==
The Congress Medal is a medal awarded each year at the congress, usually to a single individual, "in recognition of dedication to the hobby [philately] over many years".

The first recipient of the medal was Wilfred Haworth at the 1959 Congress in Torquay. In 2021, the medal was for the first time awarded jointly to two people. The original medal was designed by Ernest Hugen, but the design has since changed.

The medal is not for philatelic excellence, but for voluntary endeavours particularly at a national level. The winner is selected by the Awards Committee of the Association of British Philatelic Societies (ABPS) and must be nominated by an officer of a philatelic society affiliated to the ABPS.

=== Winners ===
- 1959: Wilfred Haworth
- 2021: Bernard Mabbett and Barry Burns
