= British Philatelic Trust =

The BPT logo.

The British Philatelic Trust was established in 1981 by the British Post Office. The governing deed was executed on 26 September 1983. The Trust is independent and was registered as an educational charity on 21 November 1983.

== Origins ==
The trust was created with the surplus funds raised by the Royal Mail for the London 1980 International Stamp Exhibition. Three miniature sheets were issued which were intended to raise funds for the exhibition but in fact they raised far more than was expected and the excess formed the trust's original endowment. This was supplemented with funds raised for Stamp World London 1990 and additional donations by the Royal Mail and others since.

== Objectives ==
The trust's objective is the study, research and dissemination of knowledge of philately.

== Governance ==
The trust has a board of trustees including a chairman and representatives from the Royal Mail. The board meets four times per annum. The chairman for many years was Francis Kiddle.

== Financial ==
The trust had net assets of £3,555,186 as at 5 April 2008 and is exempt from UK tax.
