= Berliner Philatelisten-Klub =

Berliner Philatelisten-Klub von 1888 eV
- Founded: 1888
- Founder: Richter Lindenberg
- Type: not-for-profit organization
- Purpose: Worldwide philately
- Location: Berlin, Germany
- Region served: Berlin
- Method: Lectures, exhibits, philatelic literature
- Key people: Wolfgang Bauer, President
- Revenue: membership
- Website: Berliner Philatelisten-Klub von 1888 eV

Berliner Philatelisten-Klub von 1888 eV – also known as the Berlin Philatelic Club -- is one of the oldest and most respected philatelic societies in the world, founded in 1888.

== Location ==
Berliner Philatelisten-Klub holds its meetings on Mondays at 19.00 clock (7 p.m.) at the Restaurant "Löwenbräu", Markgrafen/Leipziger Strasse 65, 10117 Berlin. Application for membership may be obtained on the club's website.

== History ==
Although attempts were made in Berlin as early as 1877 at the Berliner Briefmarken-Börse to form a club, it was not until January 1888 that the club was formed and Carl Lindenberg was named its first chairman.

== Philatelic goals ==
The club stated as its purpose the presentation of scientific lectures, exhibits of postage stamps and postal history, review of philatelic products and literature, and protection of the interests of members of the club. Officers of the club, currently, are offices of president, vice president, two secretaries, treasurer, editor and archivist.

== Philatelic literature ==
The club maintains an archive of meetings (by year) and displays philatelic literature, such as philatelic research studies on a particular issue, on its website. It also offers on-line assistance in identifying, or providing more information on, specific philatelic items.

== Lindenberg Medal ==
In 1905 the club authorized the Lindenberg Medal in honor of Judge Carl Lindenberg to be issued to those who demonstrate “conspicuous service to philately.”

== See also ==
- Philately
