= Franz Kalckhoff =

German philatelist

Dr. Franz Kalckhoff (30 November 1860 – 13 February 1955) was a German philatelist who signed the Roll of Distinguished Philatelists in 1934. He is noted as philatelic author, editor and expert on postal stationery.

== See also ==
- Kalckhoff Medal
