= Kalckhoff Medal =

German literary award

The Kalckhoff Medal (German: Kalckhoff-Medaille) is a national literary prize of Germany in the area philately. The medal is named after the German philatelist Franz Kalckhoff and is awarded by the "Bund Deutscher Philatelisten" (lit: Union of German philatelists).
