= Roberto Rosende =

American philatelist

Roberto M. Rosende is an American philatelist who was added to the Roll of Distinguished Philatelists in 1985.

Rosende is an expert in the philately of Cuba.
