= Confederate Stamp Alliance =

- Founder: August Dietz et al
- Purpose: postage stamps, postal history
- Location: USA
- Region served: Worldwide
- Method: conventions, exhibits, authentication services
- Revenue: membership
- Endowment: the Freeland-Hill-Gallagher Reference Collection
- Website: Confederate Stamp Alliance

The Confederate Stamp Alliance is a philatelic organization dedicated to the collection and study of postage stamps and postal history of the Confederate States of America (CSA). It is an affiliate (No. 73) of the American Philatelic Society.

== History ==
The Alliance was considered as a suggestion of Dr. Marye Y. Dabney to August Dietz Sr. in 1934 and established in 1935 under the cognizance of the famous CSA philatelist August Dietz, and by 1937 had already 85 active members.

== Membership ==
Membership is available to all collectors and students of postage stamps and postal history of the Confederate States of America. Application for membership may be accomplished on the Alliance’s website.

== CSA conventions ==
The Alliance conducts an annual CSA Philatelic Convention and Exhibition held at various national stamp shows across the country, allowing CSA stamp collectors to meet and discuss their hobby, and to view exhibits of CSA postal history.

== Authentication services ==
The Alliance provides authentication services for postal material of the CSA and issues Certificates of Authentication for stamps and covers found to be authentic. The service was founded and organized October 1, 1945, as the CSA Authentication Committee. It current has ten voting members, including the Recording Secretary, and a stable of consultants with expertise in specialty areas. It was renamed the CSA Authentication Service in 2006.

An important reference for the authentication service is the Freeland-Hill-Gallagher Reference Collection—a collection of Confederate fakes, forgeries, and fantasies formed by the late Rev. Paul B. Freeland. It was purchased for and donated to the Alliance in 1977 by members John R. Hill Jr. and D. Scott Gallagher.

== Confederate Philatelist ==
The official publication of the organization is its awards winning journal the Confederate Philatelist which is published quarterly. Previous publications of the organization were the Confederate Bulletin, from 1940 to 1952, and the Confederate Stamp Album, from 1956 to 1959, with The Confederate Philatelist starting publication in 1960.

== CSA Catalog project ==
In 1929, August Dietz Sr. published The Postal Service of the Confederate States of America. In 1931, Dietz published the first actual catalog that bore his name, a small volume of 320 pages that was followed up with a supplement of 80 pages in 1932. Subsequent editions were issued in 1937, 1945, 1959 and 1986. In 2006, the CSA acquired the rights to the Dietz catalogs and in 2012 published the Confederate States of America Catalog and Handbook of Stamps and Postal History (edited by Patricia A. Kaufmann, Francis J. Crown. Jr. and Jerry S. Palazolo). It is the lineal descendant of the Dietz catalogs.

== See also ==
- Postage stamps and postal history of the Confederate States
