= Smithsonian Philatelic Achievement Award =

The Smithsonian Philatelic Achievement Awards is a biennial honor presented by the United States National Postal Museum. The award is designed to recognize individuals for

"...outstanding lifetime accomplishments in the field of philately. The achievements can include original research that significantly advances our understanding of philately and postal history; exceptional service to the philatelic community, and, the overall promotion of philately for the benefit of current and future collectors."

The award was first given in 2002.
