= Emilio Diena =

Italian philatelist (1860–1941)

- Born: January 26, 1860
- Died: October 9, 1941 (aged 81)
- Engineering career
- Projects: Expert and judge of stamps of Italy and the Italian states; published much literature on the subject
- Awards: Crawford Medal; APS Hall of Fame; Lindenberg Medal

Dr. Emilio Diena (January 26, 1860 – October 9, 1941), was an Italian philatelist who specialized in the postage stamps of Italy and published substantial research on the subject. He was probably the best known Continental philatelist of his generation.

== Collecting interests ==
Diena collected and studied classic and rare postage stamps and postal history of Italy as well as the Italian states which issued their own postage stamps prior to Italian unification in the 19th century.

== Philatelic literature ==
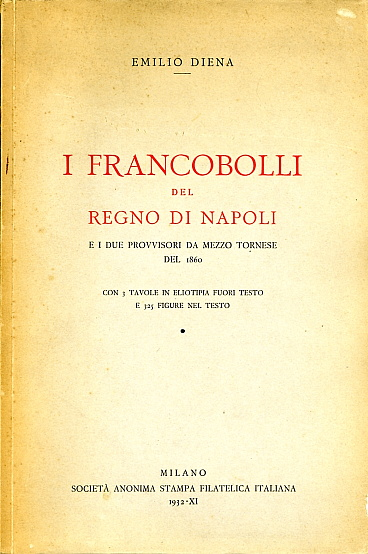
The cover of Diena's I Francobolli del Regno di Napoli, Milan, 1932.

Diena accumulated a large library of Italian-related philatelic literature which is still maintained by his family today in Rome, Italy. He became an expert on Italian stamps and in addition to expertizing rare stamps of the classic period of Italy, he wrote extensively on the subject.

In addition to writing numerous articles in philatelic journals, Diena wrote in great detail on stamps of Modena, Romagna, Sicily, Parma, and Naples during the 1920s and 1930s.

== Philatelic activity ==
Dr. Diena often served as a judge on matters related to rare stamps of Italy as well as the Italian states which issued their own postage stamps prior to Italian unification in the 19th century. These included Modena, Romagna, Sicily, Naples and Parma He was a Fellow of the Royal Philatelic Society London and served on many international philatelic juries.

== Honors and awards ==
Diena was an original signatory to the Roll of Distinguished Philatelists in 1921 and he received the Lindenberg Medal in its first year (in 1906). He was awarded the Tapling Medal in 1929 and the Crawford Medal 1934 for his “Francbolli del Regno di Napoli.” He was elected to the American Philatelic Society Hall of Fame in 2006. From the King of Italy, Diena received the Orders of the Crown of Italy and St. Maurice and St. Lazarus.

== Legacy ==
Diena died at Rome, aged 82, in 1941. The Diena family continued his work in Italian philately. Dr. Enzo Diena, the grandson of Dr. Emilio Diena, was elected to the American Philatelic Society Hall of Fame in 2001.

== See also ==
- Philately
- Philatelic literature

== References and sources ==
Sources

- Emilio Diena
