= Collectors Club of New York =

Philatelic society in New York City

Coordinates: 40°45′10.98″N 73°59′3.95″W

The Collectors Club
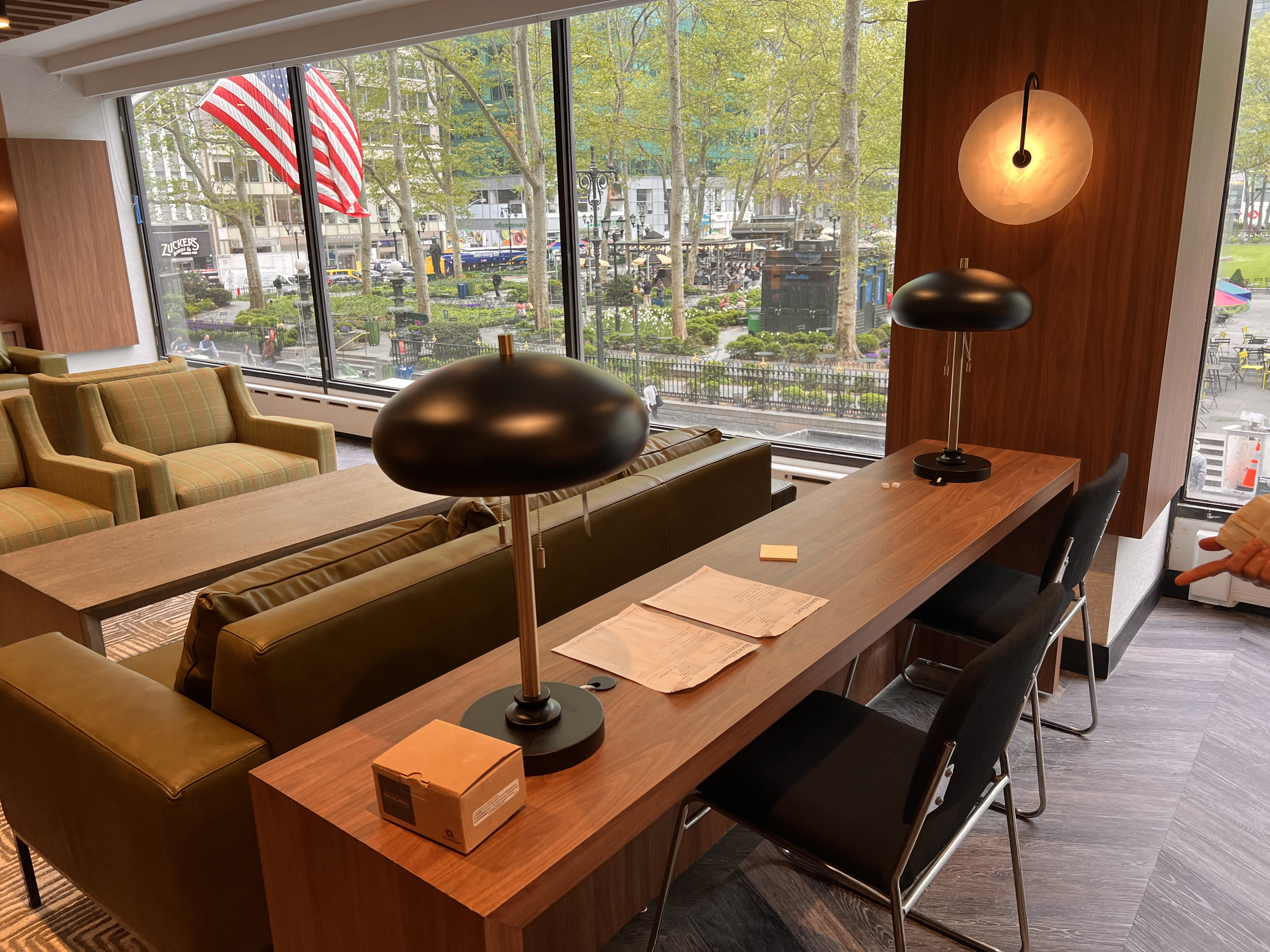
- Founded: 1896
- Type: not-for-profit organization
- Purpose: Worldwide philately
- Location: New York City
- Region served: Worldwide
- Method: Lectures, exhibits, philatelic literature
- Members: 600+
- Revenue: membership
- Website: The Collectors Club

The Collectors Club, is a private club and philatelic society in New York City. Founded in 1896, it is one of the oldest existing philatelic societies in the United States. Its stated purpose is "to further the study of philately, promote the hobby and provide a social, educational, and non-commercial setting for the enthusiastic enjoyment of our common passion".

The club operates as a 501(c)(3) Public Charity after ruling year of 1950. In 2024 it claimed $531,767 in total revenue, total expenses of $1,137,636, and total assets of $12,296,224.

From 1939 to 2023, the club was located at 22 East 35th Street between Madison and Park Avenues in the Murray Hill neighborhood of Manhattan, where it maintained a philatelic library available for research or study by scholars, historians, and philatelists. The building had originally been the home of Thomas and Fanny Clarke and was built in 1901–02, designed by the firm of McKim, Mead & White, with Stanford White as the partner in charge. The architecture is a combination of Colonial Revival style with medieval-inspired windows which recall those of Richard Norman Shaw, the avant-garde British architect of the late 19th century.

The building was purchased by the Collectors Club in 1937, and was designated a New York City landmark on September 11, 1979. It was sold in 2022 to the Republic of Serbia.

The Collectors Club produces a variety of communications. The Collectors Club Philatelist, published by the club since 1922, is currently published bi-monthly and contains scholarly articles on philatelic subjects. The club has produced hundreds of webinars which are available to members through its website. The most recent webinars are available to non-members either as participants or viewed through the club’s website until replaced by the next webinar. Monographs on a variety of subjects have been published as a member benefit. The club on occasion publishes important philatelic books which can be purchased through its website.

== The Club House ==
In 2024, the club moved to quarters on the mezzanine floor at 58 W 40th Street, on the south side of Bryant Park near the main branch of the New York Public Library. The facility is used for philatelic programs, Single Frame competitions, as a site for important philatelic auctions, and social meetings. The space houses in separate rooms, The Collectors Club library, a program room which can seat 50 comfortably, a social space overlooking Bryant Park, and a seminar room.

== Members ==
The original club was founded serving a members primarily in the New York City area. As it grew the club became less NYC centric. Today’s membership is over 600 with about 15% in the NYC area and 15% outside the United States making The Collectors Club an international philatelic organization.

Many prominent and world-famous philatelists have been members, including: Alfred F. Lichtenstein, Harry Lindquist, John Luff, John Walter Scott of Scott catalogue fame, Lawrence L. Shenfield, John J. Britt and Theodore E. Steinway. Prominent stamp collectors named as honorary members include Franklin D. Roosevelt and the 26th Earl of Crawford.

== Awards ==
The Alfred F. Lichtenstein Memorial Award for Distinguished Service to Philately, established in 1952 in honor of Alfred F. Lichtenstein, is an award issued annually by the club to a living individual for outstanding service to philately.

== See also ==
- Collectors Club of Chicago
- List of New York City Designated Landmarks in Manhattan from 14th to 59th Streets
- National Register of Historic Places listings in New York County, New York
