= List of presidents of the Royal Philatelic Society London =

This is an incomplete list of presidents of the Royal Philatelic Society London.

== 1800s ==
- Sir Daniel Cooper 1869-78
- Frederick Philbrick 1878-92
- Henry King-Tenison, 8th Earl of Kingston 1892-96
- King George V (as Prince of Wales from 1901) 1896-1910

== 1900s ==
- James Lindsay, 26th Earl of Crawford 1910-13
- M. P. Castle 1913-17
- Edward Denny Bacon 1917-23
- Thomas William Hall 1923-29
- Walter Dorning Beckton 1929-31
- Robert Blake Yardley 1931-34
- Sir John Wilson, 2nd Baronet 1934-40
- John Hall Barron 1940-46
- Eric W. Mann 1946-49
- Sir John Wilson, 2nd Baronet 1949-50
- Herbert Weston Edmunds 1950-53
- Kenneth Macdonald Beaumont 1953-56
- William Gerrish 1956-61
- H. R. Holmes 1961-64
- Benjamin Rogers-Tillstone 1964-67
- William A. Townsend 1967-70
- Alfred J. Hubbard 1970-73
- Sidney Hands 1973-75
- Ronald A. Lee 1975-77
- A. Ronald Butler 1978-80
- George South 1981-83
- John Marriott 1983-86
- John Henry Levett 1986-88
- Patrick Pearson 1988-90
- Charles Wyndham Goodwyn 1992-94
- Francis Kiddle 1994-96
- Jane Moubray 1996-98
- Alan K. Huggins
- Barrie Samuel Jay 1998-2000

== 2000s ==
- Gavin Fryer 2000-03
- David Beech 2003-05
- Christopher Harman 2005-07?
- John Sacher 2007-09?
- Alan Moorcroft 2009-11?
- Brian Trotter 2011-13
- Chris King 2013-15
- Frank Walton 2015-17
- Patrick Maselis 2017-19
- Richard Stock 2019-2021
- Peter Cockburn 2021-2023
- Michael J. Y. Roberts 2023-2024
- Simon Richards 2025-2026
- Simon Martin-Redman 2026-2027
