= Dethloff =

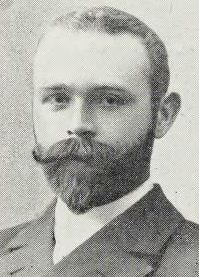
Norwegian ophthalmologist Hans Gottfried Dethloff (1871-1948)

Dethloff is a surname. The name origins from North German and comes from A Personal Name Composed Of The Ancient Germanic Elements Theod ‘People Race’ + Wolf ‘Wolf’. The family has since its origin spread across europe and the world, and is now mainly found in the United States, Germany and Norway. Notable people with the surname include

- Claus Dethloff (born 1968), German hammer thrower
- Elise Dethloff (née Stoltz; 1872–1931), Norwegian physician
- Hans Gottfried Dethloff (1871–1948), Norwegian ophthalmologist
- Henrik Dethloff (1867–1925), Norwegian philatelist
- Jürgen Dethloff (1924–2002), German inventor and engineer

== See also ==
- Dethloff Willrodt (1840–1932), American Civil War veteran and politician
