= Argento =

Argento is an Italian surname meaning "silver". Notable people with the surname include:

- Asia Argento (born 1975), Italian actress
- Claudio Argento (born 1943), Italian film-maker
- Dario Argento (born 1940), Italian film-maker
- Dominick Argento (1927–2019), American composer
- Frida Argento (born 2000), Swedish actress
- Mariano Argento (born 1962), Argentine TV actor
- Mike Argento (born 1958), American columnist and reporter from York
- Mino Argento (born 1927), Italian painter
- Tomás Argento (born 1986), Argentine hockey player
- Valentino Argento (1901–1941), Italian fencer

== See also ==
- Argento Soma, a Japanese television programme
- Nastro d'Argento, an Italian film award
- Argento Chase, Grade 2 National Hunt steeplechase in Great Britain
- PalaArgento, an indoor sporting arena in Naples, Italy
- Argenti
