= J. H. Curle =

Scottish mining engineer, traveler, writer, eugenicist and philatelist

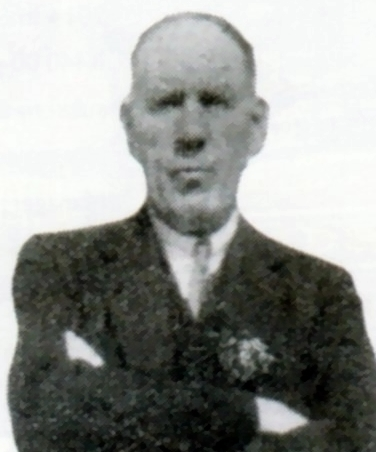
- Born: 18 October 1870; Melrose, Scotland
- Died: 26 December 1942 (aged 72); Victoria, British Columbia, Canada
- Occupations: Mining engineer, journalist, writer
- Known for: Philately

James Herbert Curle (18 October 1870 – 26 December 1942) was a Scottish mining engineer, traveler, writer, eugenicist, and philatelist. He wrote The Gold Mines of the World as well as autobiographical and travel works of a philosophical turn.

He was a member of the Eugenics Society and published To-day and To-morrow: The Testing Period of the White Race (1926) in which he surveyed the races of the world and argued that the white race was being out-bred by other races and its purity being eroded through inter-breeding with other races.

He won awards for his collection of stamps of the Transvaal and in 1940 jointly won the Crawford Medal of the Royal Philatelic Society, London, for his book on the postage stamps of that province.

== Early life ==
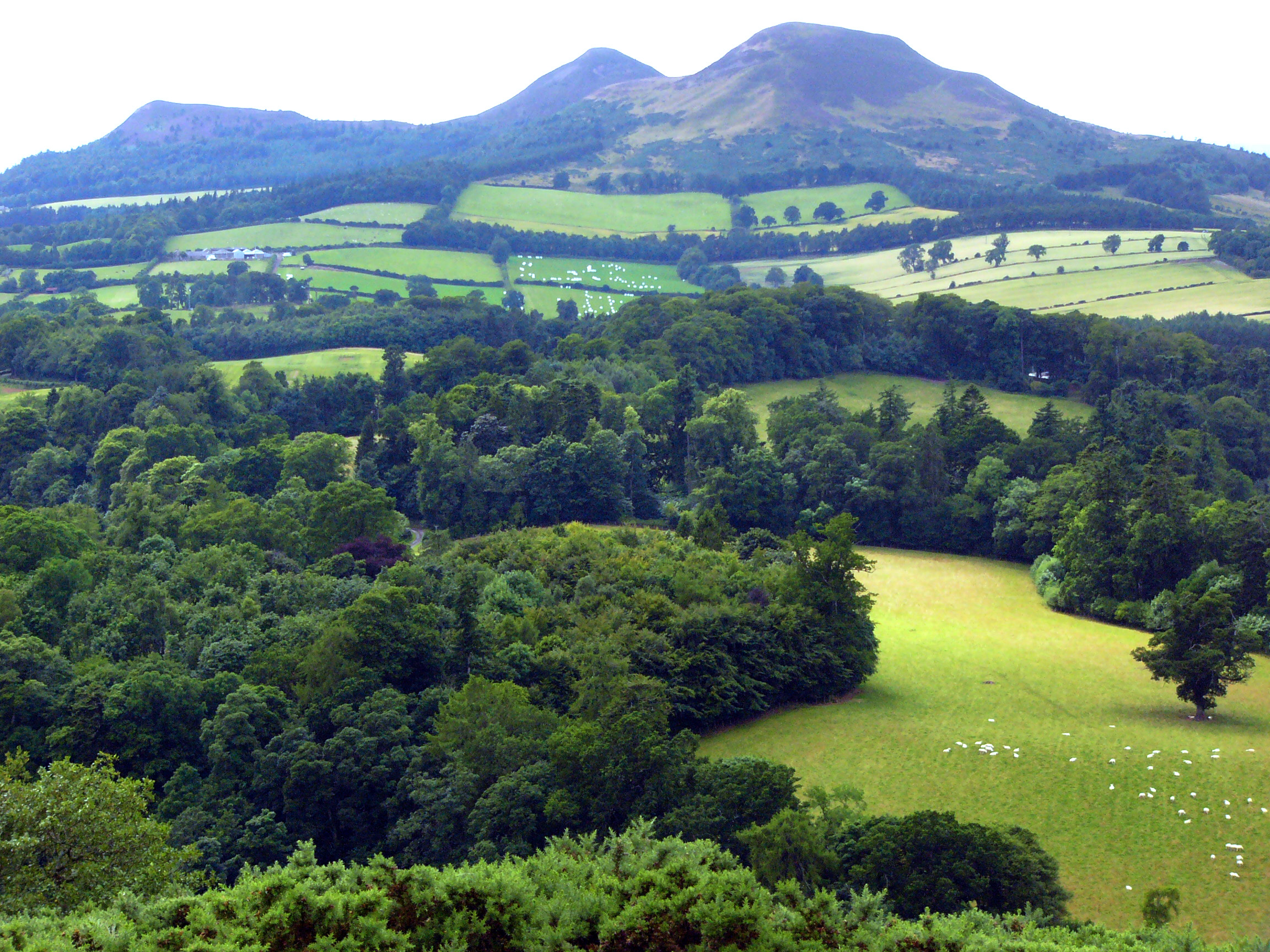
Eildon Hills near Melrose

James Curle was born in Melrose, Scotland, on 18 October 1870, one of eleven children. His father was also James Curle and his mother was Marion Passmore Whyte Newlyn. The family lived in the south of Scotland at the foot of the Eildon Hills. He was educated at a preparatory school in Worcestershire but did not attend a public school due to "an overcharged nervous system".

In 1885 he travelled to Australia in the care of a physician whose passage had been paid by Curle's father. The physician drank the brandy from Curle's flask, attributing its disappearance to "evaporation" and, according to Curle, much of the rest of the alcohol on the ship. Curle arrived in Australian at the age of 14 and after visiting relatives and staying in "the bush", visited his first gold mine at Ballarat. He visited Tasmania before returning to Scotland in 1886.

Later in 1886 he travelled to South Africa, visiting the Transvaal and Natal before returning to Scotland where he spent two years at the University of St Andrews before matriculating at Trinity Hall, University of Cambridge.

== Career ==
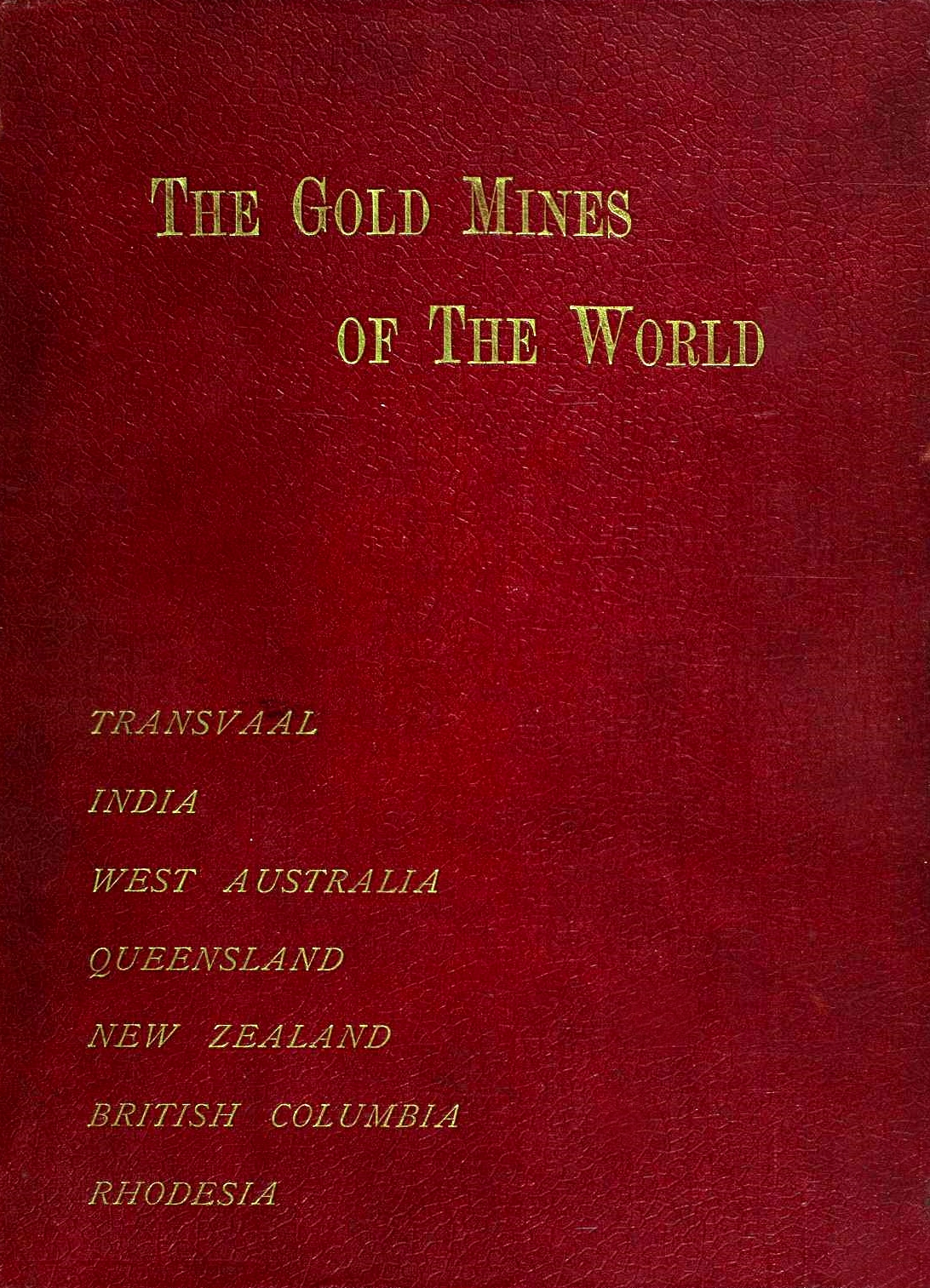
Cover of the first edition of The Gold Mines of the World, Waterlow, London, 1899

In 1891, Curle arrived in Witwatersrand, South Africa. In 1894 he was appointed mining editor of the Johannesburg Star but he left that job fairly soon after to work in mine evaluation which he did during his extensive travels. In the course of his work he acquired a great deal of financial insight into mining companies that enabled him to become wealthy by trading shares on the stock exchange.

In 1899 he published The Gold Mines of the World which had a second edition in 1902 and a third in 1905. He also wrote a number of autobiographical and travel works of a philosophical turn such as The Shadow-show (1912) and This World of Ours (1921). According to his obituary, he travelled with a large map of the world on which he recorded his journeys which for a prolonged period of time averaged 50,000 miles per annum.

The writer Manfred Nathan, who worked with Curle on The Star, described him as "a tall man with thick eye-brows and a sort of stammer" who was taciturn and did not encourage confidences. His obituary in The Eugenics Review, described him as "very much a Border Scot", shy, deflecting praise with a joke, an agnostic, of strong views but personally generous. Tall at 6 ft 3 in (191 cm), he was, however, not robust and his extensive travels were the result of determination and an inherently roving nature.

== Racial views ==
Curle was a member of the Eugenics Society and in 1926 published To-day and To-morrow: The Testing Period of the White Race in which he surveyed the races of the world and argued, as was common in eugenicist circles before the Second World War, that the white race was being out-bred by other races and its purity being eroded through inter-breeding with other races.

He described the "Negro" as the "hero of Africa", capable of great good and a gentleman, but characterized him as unsophisticated and child-like with "vivid emotions", a ready laugh, and an innate gentleness. Described as having a smaller brain than other races, Curle argued that "Evolution does not need the Negro" and saw the growth in their population in Africa as a "vast futility" but one that "we [the white race] must make the best of".

Curle placed the races of the world in a pecking-order with the white race at the top but even there he saw significant differences between different groups, seeing whites from Western Europe as more advanced than those from Eastern Europe whom he described as inferior, unstable, and ruled by emotion.

== Philately ==
He was a specialist in the stamps of Transvaal. In 1940, with Albert Basden, he was awarded the Crawford Medal by the Royal Philatelic Society London for his work Transvaal Postage Stamps. He was a signatory to the Roll of Distinguished Philatelists of South Africa.

He was unmarried and it was said of him in his obituary in The London Philatelist that his stamp collection was his "wife and children" to him and that there was no distance he would not travel to add to his collection.

== Death and legacy ==
Curle died at the Royal Jubilee Hospital on 26 December 1942, in Victoria, B.C., from cancer of the pharynx. He left his stamp collection to the Africana Museum, Johannesburg. It was displayed at the JOMAPEX 2013 stamp exhibition. He left £2,000 to the Eugenics Society.

== Selected publications ==
- The Gold Mines of the World: Containing concise and practical advice for investors gathered from a personal inspection of the mines of the Transvaal, India, West Australia, Queensland, New Zealand, British Columbia and Rhodesia &c. Waterlow, London, 1899. (2nd ed. 1902) (3rd ed. 1905)
- "The origin of the gold in the Rand banket", Journal of the Chemical, Metallurgical and Mining Society of South Africa, Vol. 8 (1907/08), pp. 198–202.
- The Shadow-show. Methuen, London. 1912.
- This World of Ours. Methuen, London, 1921.
- To-day and To-morrow: The Testing Period of the White Race. Methuen, London, 1926. (U.S. edition titled Our Testing Time: Will the White Race Win Through?)
- This World First. Methuen, London, 1931.
- The Face of Earth. Methuen, London, 1937.
- Transvaal Postage Stamps. Royal Philatelic Society, London, 1940. (With Albert Basden)
- Eskimo Pie. Methuen, London, 1942.
