= Plating (philately) =

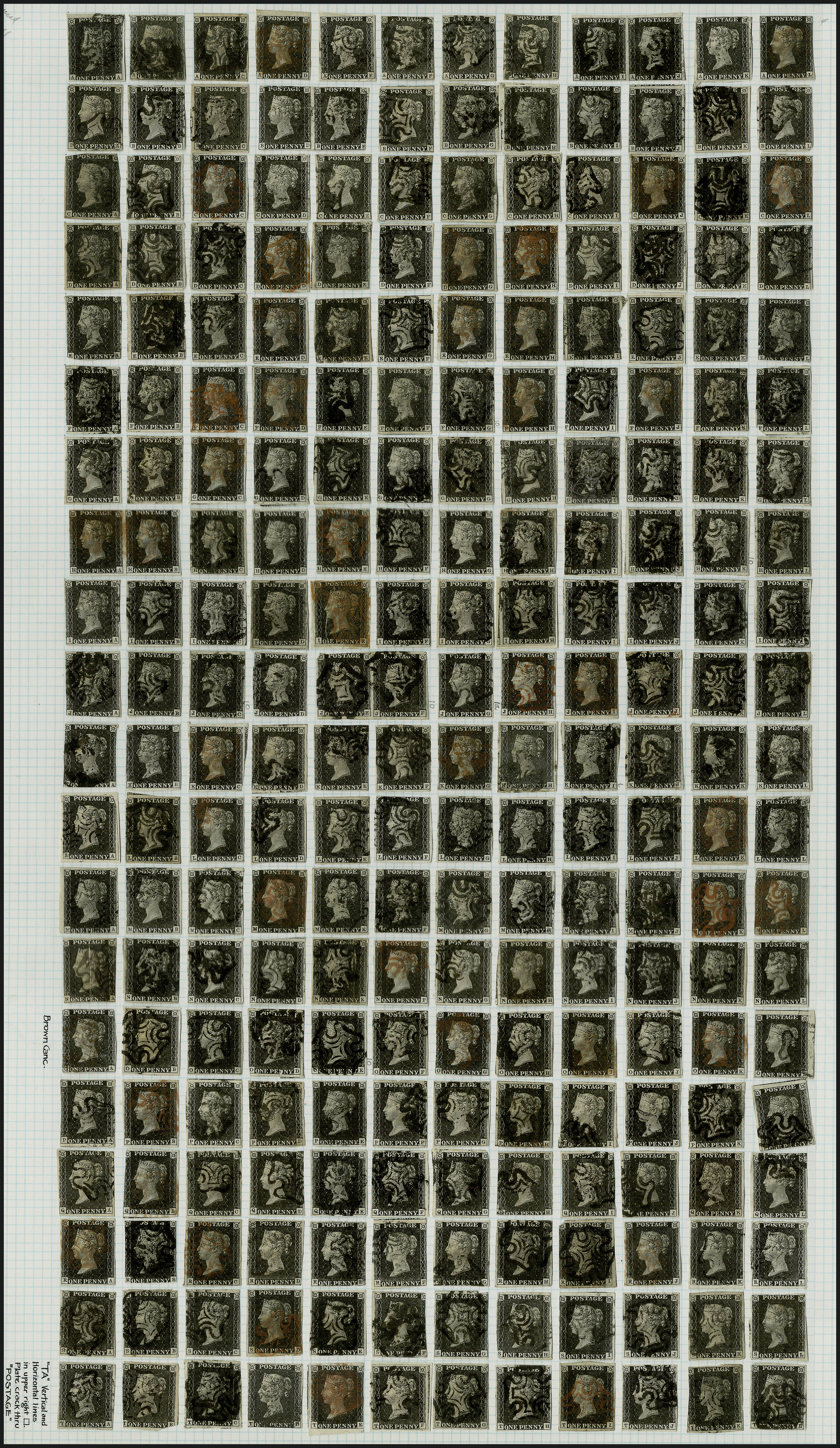
Composite plate reconstruction of 240 used Penny Black stamps

Plating refers to the reconstruction of a pane or "sheet" of postage stamps printed from a single plate by using individual stamps and overlapping strips and blocks of stamps. Likewise, if a sheet 10 or 20 postal cards is typeset, the variations of the letters or design elements may allow reconstruction or plating of the sheets based on these differences.

== Basics ==
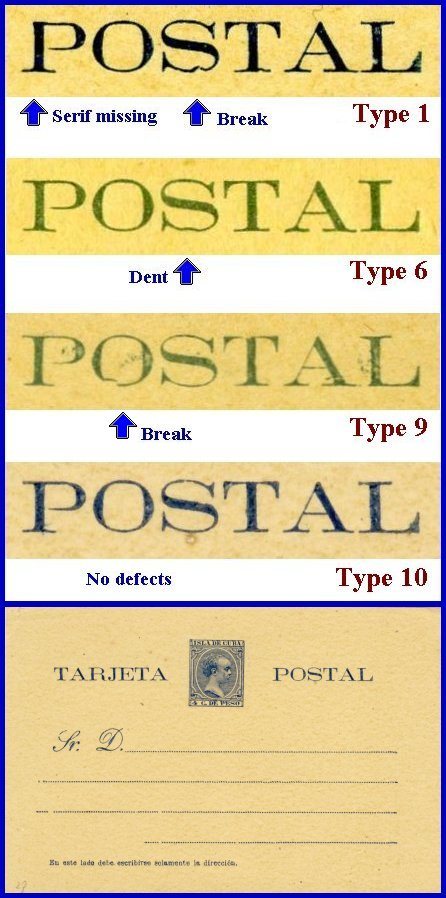
Four of ten (printed 2x5) possible types shown in this partial plating of the 1896 Cuban postal cards. The full 4 centavos card is shown as well.

For plating to be possible, there must be constant variants in details of the stamps printed from a single plate or lithographic stone so that one can identify the exact original position of each stamp. Evidence that may be used in plating includes defects or "flaws" occurring in the transfer of images, individual touch-ups by the engraver, recuttings of the plates, repairs, and accidental injuries to the plates. In addition, stamps may have been laid out in an irregular fashion on the plate with the result that differences in spacing and orientation of the stamps may be used to determine their plate positions. From their inception in 1840 until 1884, postage stamps from Great Britain incorporated control letters in the corners indicating the stamps's exact position on the sheet, e.g., A...C is first row, third stamp, and for a period also incorporated the number of the plate from which the stamps were printed. Other evidence such as color of the ink used or watermarks in the paper may be of use in reconstructing plates. In the absence of such evidence, plating is not possible. Because of the highly accurate methods of modern stamp production, most modern issues cannot be plated.

== Classic issues ==
Philatelists have made extensive efforts in plating many of the Nineteenth Century Classic postage stamp issues and have written a number of books on plating different stamp issues. One of the greatest philatelic achievements is the plating of the Penny Black and its succeeding Penny Red Brown stamps issued beginning in 1840. Those stamps were printed in sheets of 240 stamps. The plates would wear as printing went on and were often replaced. Beginning with the 71st plate of Die II in 1858, the plate number was inconspicuously engraved on the stamps themselves. All the stamps bore control letters which indicated the exact position on the sheet, so that reconstructing the plates beginning with plate 71 is simply a matter of finding the necessary stamps. The stamps printed from the first 70 plates of Die II and all the plates from Die I [over 200], however, bore no numbers to indicate the specific plate used to print them, and their plating presented vastly greater problems. Through painstaking study of the stamps, philatelists were able to reconstruct most or all of the first Die II's 70 plates. Later philatelists were assisted when reference copies and high quality photographs of the original panes kept by the British Government were made available for inspection. The other early engraved stamp issues of Great Britain have similarly been plated.

In contrast, plates of other classic stamps were relatively easy to reconstruct. One of the easiest was the stamps of Corrientes, which were individually crudely engraved so that the differences between the stamps are obvious to a non-expert. Early stamps of Mauritius have been used to reconstruct a series of original panes printed from plates displaying increasing states of wear, from early (stamps bold and clear) to late (stamps very light and weak)

== Plating studies ==
=== Great Britain ===
- Roland Brown and H.W. Fisher, The Plating of the Penny 1840-1864, 4 vols, The Great Britain Philatelic Society, London (1979-1984).
- Stanley Gibbons, Great Britain, Specialised Stamp Catalogue, Volume 1: Queen Victoria, London (8th ed. 1985).
- J.B. Seymour and C. Gardiner-Hill, The Postage Stamps of Great Britain, Part 1: Imperforate line-engraved issues, Royal Philatelic Society London (3rd. ed. 1967).
- W.R.D. Wiggins (ed.), The Postage Stamps of Great Britain, Part 2: Perforated line-engraved issues, Royal Philatelic Society London (2nd ed. 1962).

=== United States ===
- Stanley B. Ashbrook, The United States One Cent Stamp of 1851-1857.
- Carroll L. Chase, The 3¢ Stamp of the United States, 1851-1857.
- Abraham Hatfield, The New York Postmaster's Stamp.
- Mortimer L. Neinken, U.S. One Cent Stamp of 1851-61.
- Elliott Perry, Plating the 10c, 1847, Collectors Club, New York [1924-1926].

=== Elsewhere ===
- John Barefoot, Bhopal: Notes on Plating the "Primitives", Derbyshire, England (1978).
- Louis Basel, Computerized Plating of the Large Hermes Heads of Greece, Stamford, Connecticut (c. 1984).
- Bruce Cartwright, Hawaiian Islands postage stamps. Plating the engraved "five cts." blue of the issue of 1853, Honolulu, Hawaii (1911).
- Philip Cockrill, Liberia. Plating of the First Issues, 1860-1869, Newbury, Berkshire, England [1979].
- G. Dumont, France : Plating of the 20 centimes, Blue Issue 1863. Billig's Specialized Catalogue, Vol. 5, Jamaica, N.Y. (1950).
- Arthur H. Groten, Plating Canada's 2c stamp of 1864, British North America Philatelic Society, Toronto [197-?].
- D. N. Jatia, India's Bi-Coloured Four Annas 1854, A Specialised Study of Third Printing, Philatelic Congress of India, Calcutta, [May 2000].
- Emanuel J. Lee, The Postage Stamps of Uruguay; with special reference to the "plating" of most of the lithographed issues, Postilion Publications, New York [1994?].
- J.L. Guerra Aguiar, Estudio Sobre la Primera Eemisión Postal de Antillas Españolas, Cuadernos del Museo Postal Cubano, La Habana (1976). Classic plating study of the first four Cuban stamps.
- Littrell, Robert, Ed.; Postal Cards of Spanish Colonial Cuba, Philippines and Puerto Rico, UPSS, 2010; Extensive plating studies of these postal cards.

== See also ==
- Penny black printing plates
- Plate block
