= Philympia 1970 =

International stamp exhibition in London

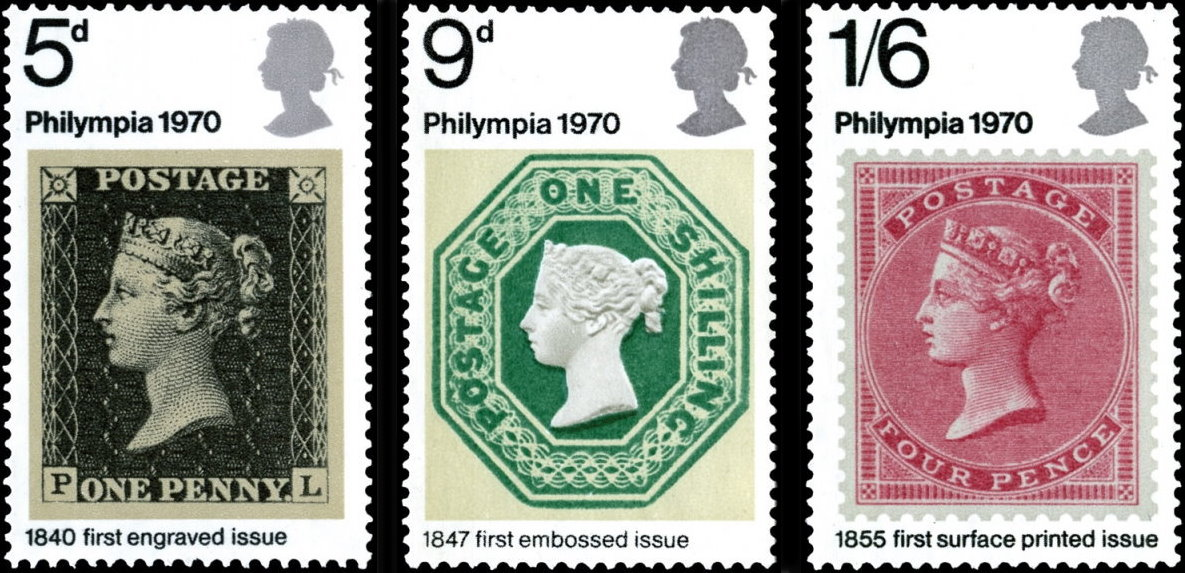
The three British commemorative stamps produced to mark Philympia 1970.

The Philympia 1970 International Stamp Exhibition was an international stamp exhibition held under Fédération Internationale de Philatélie (FIP) patronage. It was held at the Empire Hall, Olympia, London from 18 to 26 September 1970. Special three-colour postmarks were used on each of the eight days of the exhibition. A 66 ft (20 m) octagonal tower of British stamps designed by Andrew Chadwick of Hulme Chadwick & Partners with graphics by Barry O'Dwyer, was the main feature.

== Relevant British stamp issues ==
A set of three stamps were issued on 18 September to publicise the exhibition (S.G. 835/837). They were designed by David Gentleman and depicted the 1840 Penny Black (5d.), the 1847 1s. embossed (9d.) and the 1855 4d. surface-printed stamp (1/6). A 5/- stamp booklet containing 12 5d. stamps was also issued.

== Palmares ==
The main awards went to the following exhibits:

The Grand Prix went to Roger-Louis Loeuillet (France) for ‘France, 1849-70’.

The Grand Prix d’Honneur was shared by José G. Garcia (Portugal) for ‘Portugal and Colonies’ and Mohamed Dadkhah (Iran) for ‘Persia and Bushire, 1868-79’.

The best Great Britain exhibit prize went to Harold W. Fisher.

The best British Commonwealth exhibit prize went to Hiroyuki Kanai (Japan) for ‘Mauritius‘.

== See also ==
List of philatelic exhibitions (by country)
