= Ibbotson =

Ibbotson is a surname. Notable people with the surname include:

- Craig Ibbotson, rugby league footballer who played in the 2000s
- Christine Ibbotson, Ask The Money Lady: Canadian Author, Financial Journalist, Radio Host and TV Presenter
- David Ibbotson, pilot in the 2019 Piper PA-46 Malibu crash
- Derek Ibbotson MBE (1932–2017), English runner who excelled in athletics in the 1950s
- Diane Ibbotson (born 1946), English artist
- Eva Ibbotson (1925–2010), Austrian-born British novelist, known for her children's books
- Garrick Ibbotson (born 1988), Australian rules footballer in the Australian Football League
- Henry Ibbotson (1816–1886), English botanist
- Jimmy Ibbotson, American musician, member of the Nitty Gritty Dirt Band
- Peter M. Ibbotson, philatelist awarded the Crawford Medal by the Royal Philatelic Society London
- Richard Ibbotson KBE CB DSC (born 1954), former Royal Navy officer and Deputy Commander-in-Chief Fleet
- Roger G. Ibbotson, professor of finance at Yale School of Management
