= George South (disambiguation) =

George South (born 1962) is an American wrestler.

George South may also refer to:

- George South (solicitor) (1916–1988), British lawyer and philatelist
- George South Jr., wrestler, see Richie Steamboat
- George South (jockey) in Paumonok Handicap
