= Van Balen Blanken =

van Balen Blanken is a surname. Notable people with the surname include:

- G. C. van Balen Blanken, philatelist
- Nel van Balen Blanken (1917–2008), Dutch athlete
