= Adolph Koeppel =

American lawyer and philatelist (1923–2009)

Adolph Koeppel (11 April 1923 – 14 March 2009) was a distinguished American philatelist and author who wrote a number of authoritative works on the revenue stamps of Indian Princely States and on Italy Municipals that remain the standard works in their areas.

== Prize-winning collections ==
In 1989 Koeppel, with Ernest Raymond Douglas Manners (1929-1996), won the Crawford Medal from the Royal Philatelic Society London for the first two volumes of their work on Indian court fee stamps.

Keoppel's collection of British Empire impressed duty stamps, along with the W.J. Pieterse collection, formed the basis for The Impressed Duty Stamps of The British Colonial Empire (A Preliminary Listing) by William A. Barber published in 1988. An update to the 1988 edition of this catalogue (by Wm. A. Barber and Norman Seidelman) was released in 2009.

== Philatelic publications ==
- New Discovery From British Archives on The 1765 Tax Stamps For America, American Revenue Association, Boyertown, 1962. (Editor).
- "The Fiscal Stamps of North Borneo" in The American Revenuer, December 1973.
- The Stamps that Caused the American Revolution, the stamps of the 1765 British Stamp Act for America, American Revolution Bicentennial Commission, New York, 1976.
- British Post Horse Duty Stamps, Washington Metropolitan Area Fiscal Society, 1979. (With Marcus Samuel).
- The Court Fee and Revenue Stamps of the Princely States of India: An Encyclopedia and Reference Manual, Volume I, The Adhesive Stamps, Fiscal Philatelic Foundation, New York, 1983. ISBN 0-9613773-0-5. (With Raymond D. Manners)
- The Court Fee and Revenue Stamps of the Princely States of India: An Encyclopedia and Reference Manual, Volume I, The Adhesive Stamps, Supplement), Fiscal Philatelic Foundation, New York, 1986. ISBN 0-9613773-1-3. (With Raymond D. Manners)
- The Court Fee and Revenue Stamps of the Princely States of India (The Stamped Paper Including Second Adhesive Stamp Supplement Volume II), Fiscal Philatelic Foundation, New York, 1989. ISBN 0-9613773-2-1. (With Raymond D. Manners)
- Italian Municipal Revenue Stamps, Volume 1, Cities A-K, Fiscal Philatelic Foundation, New York, 1999.
- Italian Municipal Revenue Stamps, Volume 2, Cities L-Z, Fiscal Philatelic Foundation, New York, 1999. ISBN 0-9613773-3-X.

== Outside philately ==
He served in the U.S. Navy during World War II and received a medal for his actions on D-day. He also served on the USS Barton at Okinawa and in the Philippines.

A lawyer by profession, Koeppel was instrumental in developing the practice of law within real estate tax assessments. His firm still flourishes as Koeppel Martone & Leistman, LLC, located in Mineola, New York. In 2013, the firm celebrated its 50th Anniversary www.taxcert.com.
