= Archibald G. M. Batten =

British philatelist (d. 1996)

Archibald George Mount Batten
- Born: 1902
- Died: 17 May 1996 (aged 93–94)
- Occupation: Philatelist

Archibald George Mount Batten (1902 – 17 May 1996) was a British insurance industry executive and philatelist who was a specialist in the stamps of the Orange Free State. In 1976, he was awarded the Crawford Medal by the Royal Philatelic Society London for his work The Orange Free State – its postal offices and their markings 1868–1910 and in 1981 he was the first non South African to be elected to the Roll of Distinguished Philatelists of South Africa. His collection of Orange Free State postmarks and covers received over 30 medals worldwide.

Professionally, Batten rose to become a Director and General Manager of Sun Alliance and President of the Chartered Insurance Institute (1965).

== Selected insurance publications ==
- Third party insurance. Stone and Cox, 1932.
- The many faces of insurance. The Chartered Insurance Institute, 1966.

== Selected philatelic publications ==
- The postmarks of the Orange Free State and the Orange River Colony, 1868–1910. Woking: A.G.M. Batten, 1972. ISBN 0950217603
- More about the postmarks of the Orange Free State and the Orange River Colony, 1868–1910. Woking: A.G.M. Batten, 1973.
- The Orange Free State – its postal offices and their markings 1868–1910. Woking: A.G.M. Batten, 1976. ISBN 0950217646
