= Crawford Medal =

Award of the Royal Philatelic Society

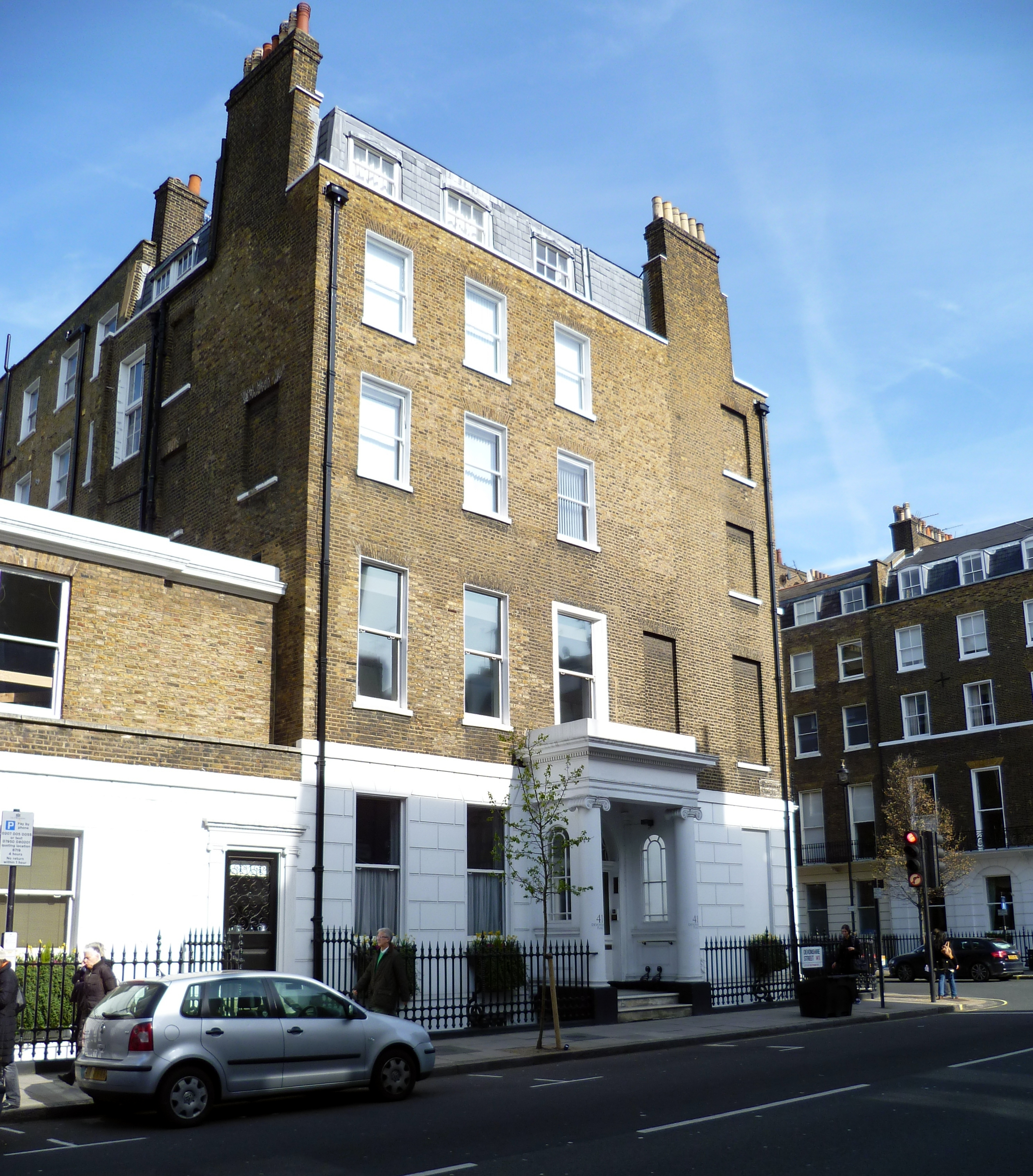
The former premises (1925–2019) of the Royal Philatelic Society London at 41 Devonshire Place, W1.

The Crawford Medal is a vermeil medal awarded by the Royal Philatelic Society London for the most valuable and original contribution to the study and knowledge of philately published in book form during the relevant period.

The medal is named after James Lindsay, 26th Earl of Crawford, who by the time of his death in 1913 had amassed the greatest philatelic library of his time.

== Other society medals ==
The society also awards these silver medals:

- The Tilleard Medal for the best large display of any aspect of philately given by one, or not more than two, Fellows or Members during the relevant period.
- The Lee Medal for the best paper dealing with any aspect of philately given by one Fellow or Member during the relevant period.
- The Tapling Medal for the best paper written by a Fellow or Member and published in The London Philatelist during the relevant period.

== List of winners of the Crawford Medal ==
Year	Author	Title
1920	Hugo Griebert	The Stamps of Spain 1850-1854
1921	Sir Edward Denny Bacon KCVO	The Line Engraved Postage Stamps of Great Britain
1922	Charles Nissen and Bertram McGowan	The Plating of the Penny Black Postage Stamp of Great Britain, 1840
1923	Charles Lathrop Pack	Victoria: The half-Length Portraits and the Twopence Queen Enthroned
1924	Lieut. Colonel G.S.F. Napier	The Stamps of the First Issue of Brazil
1925	Dr. Justus Anderssen and Henrik Dethloff	Norges Frimerker 1855-1924
1927	F. J. Peplow	The Postage Stamps of Buenos Aires
1928	C. F. Dendy Marshall	The British Post Office from its Beginning to the End of 1925
1929	A.M. Tracey Woodward	The Postage Stamps of Japan and Dependencies
1930	Dr. Carroll Chase	The 3¢ Stamp of the United States 1851-57 Issue
1931	Gilbert J. Allis	Cape of Good Hope: Its Postal History and Postage Stamps
1932	E. A. Smythies and Captain D. R. Martin	The Four Annas Lithographed Stamps of India, 1854-55
1933	E.J. Lee	The Postage Stamps of Uruguay
1934	Dr. Emilio Diena I	Francbolli del Regno di Napoli
1935	Carl Schmidt	Die Postwertzeichen der Russischen Landschaftsaemter
1936	Dr. Herbert Munk	Kohl Briefmarken-Handbuch
1937	Stanley Bryan Ashbrook	The United States Ten Cent Stamp of 1851-57
1938	Max G. Johl	United States Stamps of the 20th Century, Vol. IV
1939	Dr H. Osborne	Great Britain, Twopence Plate Nine. A Study of the Plate and its Repairs
1940	J.H. Curle and A.E. Basden	Transvaal Postage Stamps
1944	A. A. Jurgens	The Handstruck Letter Stamps of the Cape of Good Hope from 1792 to 1853 and the Postmarks from 1853 to 1910
1945	Prescott Holden Thorp	The Stamped Envelopes and Wrappers of the United States and Possessions
1947	Winthrop Smillie Boggs	The Postage Stamps and Postal history of Canada
1948	A. Tort Nicolau	Guia del Coleccionista de Sellos de Correos de España 1855-69
1949	Dr. F.E. Wood	Straits Settlements Postage Stamps
1950	L.E. Dawson	The One Anna and Two Annas Postage Stamps of India 1854-55
1951	D. Alan Stevenson	The Triangular Stamps of Cape of Good Hope
1952	J. Schmidt-Andersen	The Postage Stamps of Denmark 1851-1951
1953	Sir John Wilson Bart CVO	The Royal Philatelic Collection
1954	J. R. W. Purves	The Half Lengths of Victoria
1956	The Royal Philatelic Society of New Zealand	The Postage Stamps of New Zealand Vol III
1958	John Easton	The De La Rue History of British and Foreign Postage Stamps 1855-1901
1959	Dr. W.R. Forrester-Wood	The Stamps and Postal History of Sarawak
1960	S.D. Tchilinghirian and W.S.E. Stephen	Stamps of the Russian Empire Used Abroad (Published in multiple parts)
1961	Dr. Mohamed Dadkhah	The Lion Stamps of Persia
1962	Nicholas Argenti	The Postage Stamps of New Brunswick and Nova Scotia
1963	Dr. W.R.D. Wiggins	The Postage Stamps of Great Britain Part II
1964	Dr. Joseph Schatzkés	The Cancellations of Mexico 1856-74
1965	Joaquín Galvez Naranjo	Los Primeros Sellos de Chile 1853 a 1867
1966	Dr. S. Ichida	The Cherry Blossom Issues of Japan 1872-1876
1967	The Federation of Hungarian Philatelic Societies	A Magyar Belyagek Monografiaja: Vols I, II and V
1968	No award.	
1969	International Society of Guatemala Collectors	Guatemala Volume I Postal History and Stamps to Mid 1902
1970	No award.	
1971	No award.	
1972	George E. Hargest	History of Letter Post Communication between the United States and Europe, 1845-1875
1973	Raymond Salles	Encyclopaedie de la Poste Maritime Française Historique et Catalogue (Vols I-VIII)
1974	Robson Lowe	Encyclopaedia of British Empire Postage Stamps (Volume V)
1975	G.C. van Balen Blanken and Bert Buurman	The Netherlands - Plating of the 1852 5 cent and 10 cent values (multiple volumes 1968–77)
1976	Archibald G.M. Batten	The Orange Free State - its Postal Offices and their Markings 1868-1910
1977	No award.	
1978	A. Ronald Butler	The Departmental Stamps of South Australia
1979	Örjan Lüning	Luftpostens historia i Norden - The history of airmail in Scandinavia
1980	Harold W. Fisher	The Plating of the Penny (Volumes I-IV)
1981	Marcus Samuel and Dr. Alan K. Huggins	Specimen Stamps and Stationery of Great Britain
1982	Sigurd Ringström and Henry E. Tester	The Private Ship Letter Stamps of the World (Parts I and II)
1983	Dr. Anton Jerger	Handbooks on Austrian Lombardy-Venetia
1984	Armando Mário O. Vieira	Classicos de Relevo de Portugal
1985	Paolo Vollmeier	Storia Postale del Regno di Sardegna dalle Origini all'Introduzione del Francobollo
1986	Prof. Carlrichard Brühl	Geschichte der Philatelie: Volumes I and II
1987	No award.	
1988	Gary S. Ryan	The Cancellations of Hungarian Post Offices on the First Issue of Hungary 1867-1871
1989	Adolph Koeppel and Raymond D. Manners	The Court Fee and Revenue Stamps of the Princely States of India (Volumes I and II)
1990	Dr. Nino Aquila	I Francobolli Degli Ultimi Re
1991	Peter M. Ibbotson	The Postal History and Stamps of Mauritius
1992	J. Michael and P. Jane Moubray	British Letter Mail to Overseas Destinations 1840-1875
1993	Jack F. Ince and S. John Sacher	The Postal Services of the British Nigeria Region
1994	James van der Linden	Catalogue des Marques de Passage
1995	H.E. Walker and J.H. Coles	Postal Cancellations of the Ottoman Empire: Parts 1 to 4
1996	Paolo Vollmeier and Vittorio Mancini	Storia Postale del Regno di Napoli dalle Origini all'Introdzione del Francobollo
1997	No award.	
1998	Peter E. Fernbank	King George V Key Plates of the Imperium Postage and Revenue Design
1999	Hugh V. Feldman	Letter Receivers of London 1652-1857: A History of their Offices and Handstamps within the General, Penny and Twopenny Posts
2000	Professor Peter A. S. Smith	Egypt - Stamps and Postal History - A Philatelic Treatise
2001	G.C. Akerman and Gavin H. Fryer	The Reform of the Post Office in the Victorian Era and Its Impact on Economic and Social Activity
2002	Dr. Ulrich Ferchenbauer	Österreich 1850-1918
2003	F. Heimbuchler	Rumanien/Romania: Furstentum Walachei 1820-1862, Vereinige Füstentümer 1862-1872 (Principality of Wallachia 1820–1862, United Principalities 1862-1872 (Completing the work started with the author's Romania: The Bull's Heads of Moldavia, 1852–1862)
2004	Claude J.P. Delbeke	Nederlandse Scheepspost, II, Nederland en det Westen 1600-1900 (Completing the work started with the author's Nederlandse Scheepspost, I, Nederland - Oost-Indie 1600-1900)
2005	Robert P. Odenweller	The Stamps and Postal History of Nineteenth Century Samoa
2006	Bryan Kearsley	Discovering Seahorses – King George V High Values
2007	No award.	
2008	David A. Stotter	The British Post Office Service in Morocco 1907-57
2009	Eric Yendall	King George VI Large Key Type Revenue and Postage High Value Stamps 1937-1953
2010	Michèle Chauvet	Introduction à l'Histoire Postale (de France)
2011	Robert P. Odenweller	The Postage Stamps of New Zealand 1855-1873: The Chalon Head Issues
2012	David Tett	A Postal History of the Prisoners of War and Civilian Internees in East Asia During the Second World War: Volumes 1 to 5
2013	Kees Adema	Netherlands Mail in Times of Turmoil: Volumes 1, 2 and 3
2014	Peter van der Molen	Swaziland Philately to 1968
2015	Kenneth Scudder	Queensland Postage Stamps 1879-1912
2016	Steven C. Walske and Richard Frajola	Mails of the Westward Expansion, 1803–1861
2017	James Bendon	U.P.U. Specimen Stamps 1878-1961
2018	Hugh V. Feldman	United States Railroad Mail Routes and Contracts 1832-1875
2019	Alan Druce	Perkins Bacon Great Britain Line-engraved Postage Stamp Printing 1840-1846
2020	James P. Gough	The Postal History of the Universal Postal Union: The Postal Card (Worldwide) 1869-1974
2021	James Grimwood-Taylor	International Postal Reforms
2022	Guillermo F. Gallegos and Joseph D. Hahn	The 19th Century Issues of El Salvador, 1867-1900
2023	Lars Engelbrecht	Postal Stationery Of Denmark: The Bi-Coloured Issue 1871-1905
2024	Luis & Eduardo Barreiros	Portuguese India: Postal History and the First Issues from the ‘natives’ to 1900
2025	Tomas Bjäringer & Mårten Sundberg	Tété Béche: Rarities from the Oval-Issue of Finland

== See also ==
- Crawford Library
- List of philatelic awards

== References and sources ==
Sources

- The Society's medals and honorary fellowship. London: The Royal Philatelic Society London, 2009.
