= John Easton (philatelist) =

Printer and philatelic author (1895–1967)

John Easton (16 February 1895 – 1967) was a printer and philatelic author who signed the Roll of Distinguished Philatelists in 1960.

== Works ==
Easton wrote The De La Rue History of British and Foreign Postage Stamps 1855-1901 for which he received the Crawford Medal from the Royal Philatelic Society London in 1958, and with Arnold M. Strange he edited Perkins Bacon Records based on the work of Percy de Worms.

The London printing works of De La Rue were destroyed on the night of 29 December 1940 during a World War II air raid. The Day Books and Correspondence Books of the firm survived however and after the war the Royal Philatelic Society London was granted access to the records in order to compile a philatelic history of the first fifty years of De La Rue. John Easton, with assistance from the firm, converted those records into The De la Rue History of British and Foreign Postage Stamps 1855 to 1901 with each transaction at the firm described in the order in which it was entered in the company's books. His work has become an essential reference for philatelists interested in stamps of the nineteenth century.

His re-working of Melville's Postage Stamps in the Making, however, has been criticised for containing serious errors in describing processes.

== Selected publications ==
- British Postage Stamp Design, Faber & Faber Ltd., London, 1943. (4th Edition; 1946)
- Postage Stamps in the Making: rewritten and completed, Faber & Faber Ltd., London, 1949. (a revision of Fred Melville's 1916 book of the same name)
- The Engraving Methods of De La Rue, R.P.S.L., 1950.
- Perkins Bacon Records: extracted with a commentary by the Late Percy de Worms, The Royal Philatelic Society, London, 1953. (Editor and writer of the introduction with Arnold M. Strange).
- The De La Rue History of British and Foreign Postage Stamps 1855 to 1901, Faber & Faber for the Royal Philatelic Society, London, 1958.
- The Postage Stamps of Great Britain, Part III: The Embossed and Surface Printed Issues of Queen Victoria, The Surface Printed issues of King Edward VII, revised edition, The Royal Philatelic Society, London, 1964. (Editor with K.M. Beaumont)
- The Postage Stamps of Great Britain Part I: Introduction to the line-engraved issues, the imperforate line-engraved issues, J.B. Seymour and Clive Gardiner-Hill, third edition, Royal Philatelic Society London, 1967. (Editor)
- "The Perkins Bacon Engraving Books 1899 to 1935: Newfoundland." in The London Philatelist, Vol.73, No.855, pp. 44–48. (and many similar articles published from 1963 to 1967)
