= A. E. Basden =

British philatelist

Albert Edward Basden, MBE 1918, (? in Reading, Berks – 1948 in Durban) was a philatelist who was a specialist in the stamps of South Africa and Transvaal in particular. In 1940, with J.H. Curle, he was awarded the Crawford Medal by the Royal Philatelic Society London for his work Transvaal Postage Stamps.

Basden was a President of the Pretoria Philatelic Society and a signatory to the Roll of Distinguished Philatelists of South Africa.

== Selected publications ==
- Transvaal postage stamps. London: Royal Philatelic Society, 1940.
- Standard priced catalogue of the postage stamps of the Union of South Africa. (With L. Simenhoff)
