= Kearsley (surname) =

Origin
- Language: Old English
- Origin: Cherselawe
- Derivation: English
- Meaning: Wood, glade or clearing

Other names
- Variant forms: Kersley, Kereslie, Kiersley

Kearsley is a surname of English origin with a variety of spellings apparently locational in origin, the towns of Kearsley formerly in the county of Lancashire, now in Greater Manchester and also the town of Keresley in the county of Warwickshire have been speculated as being possible origins of the surname.

== Notable people with the surname Kearsley ==
- Delmar Kearsley, (1898 - 1975) African American, rigger on the Croton Dam and owner of the first ever Black business in the town of Croton, New York, The Croton Ice Service
- Joseph Early Kearsley, (1867–1960) African American, rigger on the Croton Dam
- Bryan Kearsley, British philatelist
- Harvey Kearsley (1880–1956), British Army officer and courtier
- Jonathan Kearsley (1786–1859), American military officer and politician
- Susanna Kearsley, Canadian writer
- William Kearsley (1863–1921), Australian politician

== See also ==
Kearsley (disambiguation)
