= British Society of Russian Philately =

- Founded: October 31, 1936
- Founder: Dr Alfred Henry Wortman
- Type: not-for-profit organization
- Purpose: Postage stamps and postal history of Russia
- Location: England
- Origins: The Russian Study Circle
- Region served: Worldwide
- Method: meetings, journal, auctions, exhibits
- Members: 300 – Half live in the United Kingdom
- Key people: Alan Blunt, president
- Revenue: membership fees
- Website: British Society of Russian Philately

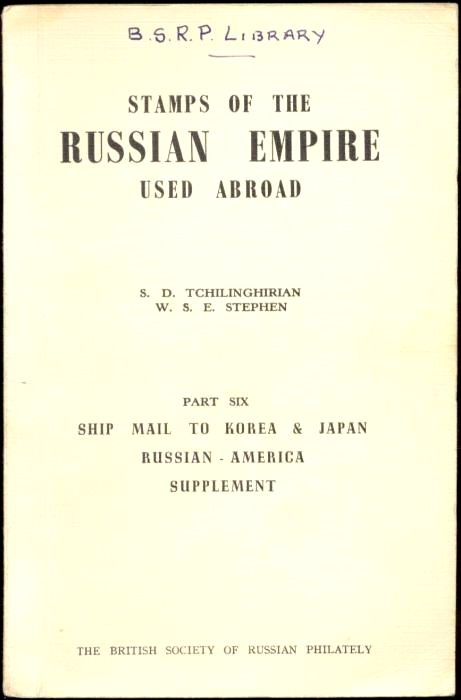
The cover of part 6 of Stamps of the Russian Empire used abroad by Tchilinghirian & Stephen.

The British Society of Russian Philately is a philatelic society dedicated to the study of postage stamps and postal history of Russia and Russian-related countries.

== History ==
The society was founded in 1936 by Dr A H Wortman (7 Sept. 1898 - 15 Jan. 1983) who was its first president. He remained a member of the Executive Committee until he died. Initially the society was known as The Russian Study Circle.

Other presidents have included Dr Raymond Casey, Herbert Roy Chamberlain and George Henderson.

At an extraordinary general meeting on 22 May 2023 a decision to dissolve the BSRP on 31 December 2023 was taken by the Acting President and Society Committee.

== Meetings ==
Meetings of the society are held five times a year in London and also in several regional areas.

== Services ==
The society offers various services, such as auctions, expertization of stamps, exchange packets, use of the society’s philatelic library, philatelic book reviews, and upcoming show/exhibition listings.

== Publications ==
A regular journal is published.

In 1960, S.D. Tchilinghirian and W.S.E. Stephen won the Crawford Medal of the Royal Philatelic Society London for their work Stamps of the Russian Empire used abroad which was issued in parts over several years.

== Organisation ==
The society is administered by a set of officers, including president, secretary, treasurer, librarian, journal editor, exchange packet secretary, auction secretary, publicity officer, newsletter editor, expertising committee secretary, Russia consultant and representative in North America.

== See also ==
- Postage stamps and postal history of Russia
