= Henry Ibbetson =

Henry Ibbetson may refer to:

- Henry Selwin-Ibbetson, British Conservative politician
- Henry Ibbotson, English botanist
