= Raymond Casey (geologist) =

British geologist

- Born: October 10, 1917; Folkestone, Kent, England
- Died: April 26, 2016 (aged 98)
- Scientific career
- Fields: Geology
- Institutions: University of Reading

Raymond Casey, FRS, FGS (10 October 1917 – 26 April 2016) was a British geologist.

== Life ==
He was born in Folkestone, Kent and educated at St. Mary’s Higher Grade Boys School, Folkestone. After war service as aircrew in the RAF he worked with the Geological Survey, where he researched Palaeozoic stratigraphy. In the mid-1950s he did a PhD course at Reading University involving a study of the Lower Greensand deposits.

In 1970 he was elected a Fellow of the Royal Society, his election citation describing him as

An authority in a wide field of Mesozoic stratigraphy and palaeontology. His field observations and palaeontological discoveries have clarified depositional history and structural relationships of the English Lower Cretaceous, notably the Lower Greensand. His work on the ammonites has revised correlation in many parts of the globe, notably southeast U.S.A., and has fundamentally modified ideas on stratigraphy and palaeogeography at the Jurassic-Cretaceous boundary in northern Europe. He has elucidated the hinge-structures of many heterodont bivalves and shown that these structures have practical use in subdividing the Purbeck-Wealden series.

He retired from the Geological Survey in 1979, but in 1994 joined the British Museum as an Honorary Research Fellow in order to continue his studies of the Lower Greensand, his particular lifelong interest.

His other interest was philately, especially Russian; he was president of the British Society of Russian Philately and a Fellow of the Royal Philatelic Society.

He died in 2016. He had married Norah Pakeman and had 2 sons.

His researches on ammonites had revised previous theories about the rock formations of the Jurassic–Cretaceous boundary in Northern Europe and his studies of hinge structure of shells had helped to define varying climates of past geological periods.
