= Hugo Griebert =

Emil Paul Hugo Griebert (31 October 1868 – 23 July 1924) was a German-British stamp dealer and philatelist, who was a specialist in the stamps of Spain. He was entered on the Roll of Distinguished Philatelists in 1921.

Griebert was born in Berlin, Brandenburg (then Prussia) to Hermann Jacob Wilhelm Griebert and Ernestine Hermine August Griebert.

He was awarded the Crawford Medal by the Royal Philatelic Society London for his work The stamps of Spain 1850-1854.

He died at 56 Hallam Street in Marylebone, London.

== Selected publications ==
- The stamps of Spain 1850–1854. London: Hugo Griebert, 1920.
- A study of the stamps of Uruguay. London: Hugo Griebert, 1910.
