= Herbert Munk =

German philatelist

Herbert Munk (26 June 1875 – 19 April 1953) was a distinguished German philatelist and editor of important sections of the seminal Kohl Briefmarken-Handbuch for which he and J.B. Seymour won the Sieger Medal for best philatelic work in the German language in 1931.

Munk was president of the Expert Committee of the Union of German Philatelic Societies, and an international philatelic juror before World War Two. He won the Lindenberg Medal in 1925 and his name was added to the Roll of Distinguished Philatelists at Torquay in 1932. He signed the roll personally at the Brighton congress in 1933.

In 1936 Munk won the Crawford Medal of the Royal Philatelic Society London, of which society he was a Fellow, and he is a member of the American Philatelic Society Hall of Fame.

Munk left Germany before the outbreak of war and continued his philatelic work in Switzerland where he did research on early Swiss stamps. A report in the Australian Stamp Monthly, 1 November 1937, states that sources in Germany believed that he was effectively in exile as a "non-Aryan".

Munk became an honorary member of the Collectors Club of New York in 1949.

== Selected publications ==
- Kohl Briefmarken-Handbuch. (editor of the 11th edition 1923-36, A to Italy)
- Neue Wege zur Erforschung der eidgenössischen Ausgaben 1850 ff. im Kreuzmuster, 1941.
- Allerlei Neues über Locale and Ortspost, 1951.
