= W. R. Forrester-Wood =

FRCS FRPSL William Rodney Forrester-Wood
- Born: June 25, 1902; Southport, England
- Died: April 6, 1960 (aged 57)
- Occupation: Philatelist
- Medical career
- Field: Surgeon

William Rodney Forrester-Wood FRCS FRPSL (25 June 1902 – 6 April 1960) was a British surgeon and philatelist who was an expert on the postal history of Sarawak. In 1959, he was awarded the Crawford Medal by the Royal Philatelic Society London for his work The Stamps and Postal History of Sarawak. He specialised in children's and thoracic surgery.

== Early life and education ==
Born in Southport, he was the son of a general-practitioner-surgeon. He lost his sight in one eye at age 12, which prevented him from his goal of joining the Army. He was educated at Cheltenham College in Gloucestershire, and was apprenticed to an engineering firm at age 16. The post-World War depression led his father to recommend a medical career for his son. He then studied medicine at Gonville and Caius College, Cambridge, with clinical training at Bartholomew's Hospital in 1929. In 1930, he graduated with M.B., B.Ch. degree.

== Career ==
Forrester-Wood did his medical residencies at Addenbrooke's Hospital in Cambridge, the East Ham Memorial Hospital, and the Royal Sussex County Hospital in Brighton. In 1932, he was made a FRCS. He was senior general surgeon in the Brighton and Lewes and Mid-Sussex hospital groups.

In 1936, Forrester-Wood was elected to the senior staff of the Royal Sussex County Hospital, and was a consulting surgeon to several other hospitals, including the Royal Alexandra Children's Hospital, the Haywards Heath Hospital, the Heritage Craft Schools and Hospitals for Crippled Children, the St. Francis Hospital in London (1895–1991) and the Hurstwood Park Hospital. He was also later appointed to the staff of Cuckfield Hospital, built during the Second World War for Canadian forces, after it was taken over by the National Health Service (NHS).

Forrester-Wood specialised in children's surgery as well as thoracic surgery and was in very wide demand thanks to his reputation. He frequently contributed to the British Journal of Surgery and the Royal Society of Medicine's Clinical Section.

Forrester-Wood was secretary of the Brighton and Sussex Medico-chirurgical Society and for many years served on the executive committee British Medical Association's local division, including as chairman. After the rise of the NHS, Forrester-Wood's responsibilities expanded, and sat on numerous committees as hospitals expanded and were reorganised. As was noted by the British Medical Journal, "He was the unchallenged and universal choice for these offices, for his hospital colleagues had implicit trust in his judgment and integrity, and his outwardly calm temperament combined with firmness and humour to control many difficult situations."

== Illness and death ==
The stress apparently became too much, and Forrester-Wood suffered a heart attack in 1958. While he recovered, he was still in heavy demand, and tried to relax with other activities. In addition to his interest in stamps, he enjoyed fishing, gardening, shooting and horseback riding. He suffered a detached retina in his good eye during a fall off a horse, but his sight was saved by successful surgery. He was also a freemason with provincial rank in the Craft and Royal Arch. He was a President of the Sarawak Specialists' Society.

Forrester-Wood had apparently been considered fully recovered as his death at age 57, during his sleep at home in Brighton, was considered a shock. He died before the Crawford Medal was to have been presented to him. He was survived by his widow and a son.

He was eulogised in the British Medical Journal:

The loss of this relatively young, very able, and universally trusted man has been a very great shock to the whole profession over a wide area, and will be keenly felt for a long time and in many ways. He combined the values of the older generation with the judgment and abilities of the new, and his courage provided an abiding example and inspiration.

== Selected publications ==
- The stamps and postal history of Sarawak. Sarawak Specialists' Society, 1959. (Supplement by L.H. Shipman, 1970)
