= Kearsley (disambiguation) =

Kearsley is a town in Bolton, Greater Manchester, England.

Kearsley may also refer to:

- Kearsley, New South Wales, in the City of Cessnock, Australia
- Kearsley, Northumberland, England, in Matfen parish
- Kearsley (surname)
- Kearsley Township, Michigan, a former civil township in Genesee County, Michigan, United States

== See also ==
- Keresley, a village in the City of Coventry, West Midlands, England
