= Eric Yendall =

British philatelist

Eric Peter Yendall is a British philatelist who, in 2009, was awarded the Crawford Medal by the Royal Philatelic Society London for his work King George VI large key type revenue and postage high value stamps 1937-1953.

Yendall was born in Enfield, Middlesex, and emigrated with his family to Ottawa, Canada at age eleven. He is retired after a career in international development with the Canadian government during which time he travelled extensively. He is a graduate of Queen's University (BA Economics 1968) and the University of Toronto, Rotman School of Management (MBA Finance, 1972).

== Selected publications ==
- King George VI large key type revenue and postage high value stamps 1937-1953. Royal Philatelic Society London, 2008. ISBN 9780900631542
