= David A. Stotter =

British philatelist

David A. Stotter

Dr. David Arthur Stotter (12 September 1949 – 17 September 2016) was a British philatelist who in 2008 was awarded the Crawford Medal by the Royal Philatelic Society London for his book The British Post Office Service in Morocco 1907–57.

In 2003, the Royal Philatelic Society London selected him as the recipient of a Julian Chapman Memorial Scholarship to support his philatelic research.

In addition to his work as a philatelist, he ran his own business (Asia Consult Limited) from 2003 to 2014.

From 1996 to 2001, he served as a Senior Consultant and Associate at Nexant (formerly Chem System, Inc.), a global energy, oil and gas, and chemicals consulting firm.

He earned an M.A. and a Ph.D. in chemistry from Churchill College at Cambridge University.

He attended Howardian High School in Cardiff in South Wales.

David was married to Felisa Dy. They had two children, Alan and Ivy.

== Selected publications ==
- "The British Post Office Service in Morocco 1907-57". The Postal History Society and the British Philatelic Trust, York, 2007. ISBN 9780853770282
- "The Stamps of the Morocco Agencies, Adhesives Overprinted for the British Post Office Service in Morocco and Use of Unoverprinted British Stamps" (Editor). The G.B. Overprints Society 2011. This loose leaf publication is an ongoing project and the next two chapters were published in February 2015.
- "A Postcard from Tangier. A Postal & Social History of Tangier 1880-1958". The Postal History Society, Saffron Waldon UK, 2015. ISBN 9780853770343. This book was awarded a Large Vermeil at the European Philatelic Exhibition, London 2015.
