= F. J. Peplow =

British librarian and philatelist (1872–1935)

Frank Jukes Peplow (c. 1872 – 10 October 1935) was Borough Librarian at Deptford and a philatelist who won the Crawford Medal from the Royal Philatelic Society London in 1927 for his work The Postage Stamps of Buenos Aires. He signed the Roll of Distinguished Philatelists in 1933.

== Argentina and Japan ==
Peplow was an expert on the stamps of Argentina and Japan. With Lionel Fulcher he plated first two issues of Japan and published the results in Plates of the Stamps of Japan 1871-76 (1910). He bought important holdings of Japan in the Ferrary and Duveen sales and won the Golden Palm of Honour for his Japanese stamps at the New York Exhibition of 1926. His Japanese collection was subsequently acquired by A.M. Tracey Woodward.

== Organised philately ==
In organised philately, Peplow was the Hon Secretary and Treasurer of the Philatelic Literature Society and a Council member of the Royal Philatelic Society London from 1910 to 1922. With Lionel Fulcher he edited The Philatelic Record, which job they took over from W.D. Beckton.

== Outside philately ==
Peplow collected Japanese artefacts including netsuke, metal-work and ornamental swords. He died on 10 October 1935 and was survived by two sisters. He was unmarried. His funeral took place at All Saints' Church, Blackheath, on 14 October.

== Selected publications ==
- Plates of the Stamps of Japan 1871-76. London: F.J. Peplow, 1910. (Privately printed - 25 copies.)
- The Postage Stamps of Buenos Aires. London: F.J. Peplow, 1925. (Privately printed - 100 copies.)
- Proofs of the Rivadavia Stamps of the Argentine Republic, 5 centavos plate C, 10 centavos plate B, 15 centavos plate B. London: Perkins, Bacon & Co., 1925. (Limited to 50 copies.)
- "The Plates of the Stamps of Hong Kong 1862-91." in Gibbons Stamp Monthly, February 1935.
