= Lars Engelbrecht =

Danish philatelist

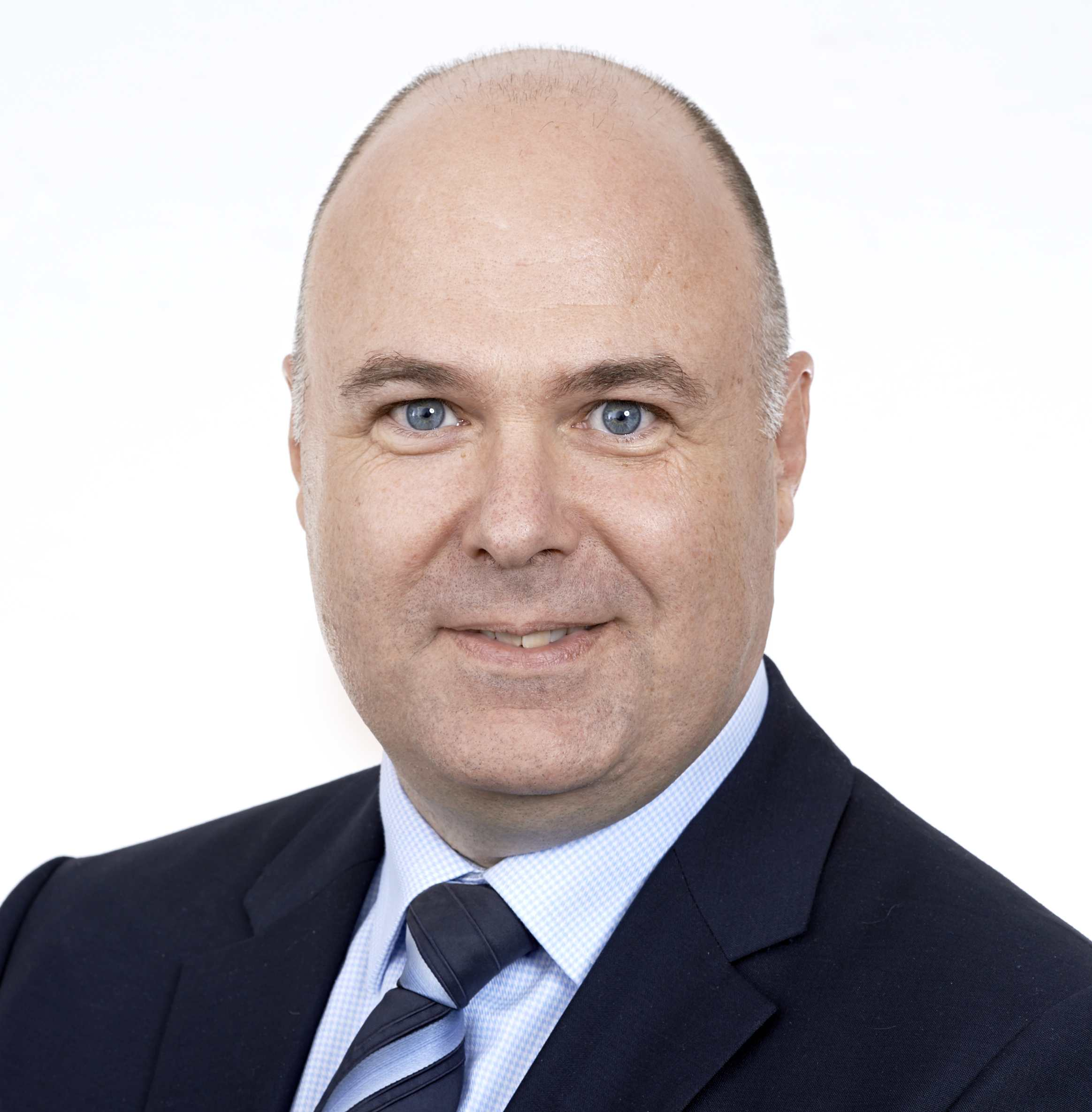
Lars Engelbrecht

Lars Engelbrecht (born 1968) is a Danish philatelist who in 2016 was invited to sign the Roll of Distinguished Philatelists. He is a specialist in the postal stationery of Denmark and a philatelic judge. Lars was chairman of the FIP Postal Stationery Commission from 2012 to 2018. He won the Lee Medal from the Royal Philatelic Society London in 2014. In 2021 he issued the two volume book "Denmark Postal Stationery - The Bi-coloured Issue 1871-1905" for which he in 2023 received the Crawford Medal.
