= Gilbert J. Allis =

British philatelist

Gilbert James Allis (c. 1879–1932) was a philatelist who was a specialist in the stamps of southern Africa. In 1931, he was awarded the Crawford Medal by the Royal Philatelic Society London for his work Cape of Good Hope: Its postal history & postage stamps. He was the President of the Cape Town Philatelic Society and the first signatory to the Roll of Distinguished Philatelists of South Africa.

== Selected publications ==
- Cape of Good Hope: Its postal history & postage stamps. London: Stanley Gibbons, 1930.
