= Justus Anderssen =

Norwegian physician and philatelist

Dr. Justus Henrik Anderssen (30 December 1867 – 15 June 1938) was a Norwegian physician and philatelist.

== Early life and education ==
Anderssen was born in Kristiania, the son of Richard Anderssen (1836–1922) and Fredrikke Anfinsen (1838–1905), and the brother of lawyer Johannes Falck Anderssen. He finished his secondary education in 1886 and graduated from Royal Frederick University in 1893 with a cand.med. degree. From 1899 he was a practising physician in Kristiania, and published in medical journals from time to time.

== Career ==
As a philatelist he was a specialist in the stamps of Norway and was entered on the Roll of Distinguished Philatelists in 1921. He edited the Nordic periodical Nordisk Filatelistisk Tidsskrift (1913–1914, 1919–) and the philately column in A-Magasinet (1927–). With Henrik Dethloff he published Norges Frimerker, 1855-1914 and later Norges Frimerker, 1855-1924 (Postage Stamps of Norway, 1855-1924) as well as Frimerkesamlerens A. B. C. in 1915. Andersen and Dethloff received the Crawford Medal from the Royal Philatelic Society London in 1925 for their work Norges Frimerker, 1855-1924. He died in June 1938.
