= Kohl Briefmarken-Handbuch =

The Kohl Briefmarken-Handbuch was a seminal work of philatelic literature first published in Germany in 1923 as the 11th edition of the previous well known Handbuch published by Paul Kohl of Chemnitz.

== Production of the work ==
The work was edited by the renowned philatelist Dr Herbert Munk who was supported in his endeavours by the Verein der Freunde des Kohl-Briefmarkenhandbuchs, e.V., whose members were a group of international philatelists.

== English language publication ==
The Collectors Club of New York acquired the American rights to the work and several sections were translated and published in their journal The Collectors Club Philatelist.

The English rights were acquired by the Royal Philatelic Society London (RPSL) and the Handbuch formed the basis for important parts of the society's multi-volume work The Stamps of Great Britain. This was only appropriate as much of the Great Britain section in the Handbuch had been prepared from material supplied by the RPSL member J.B. Seymour who had one of the greatest collections of British stamps at the time.

== Awards ==
Seymour and Munk were given the Sieger Medal for their collaboration on Great Britain in the Handbuch which was considered the best philatelic work in the German language in 1931. And in 1936 Munk won the Crawford Medal of the RPSL for his editorial work on the Handbuch.
