= Carlrichard Brühl =

German historian and philatelist

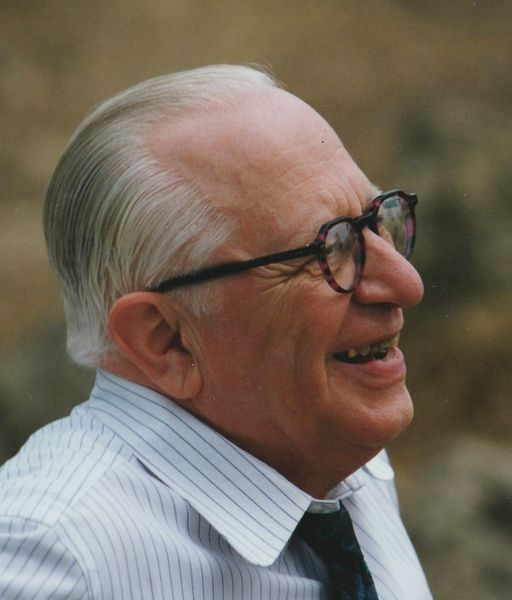
Carlrichard Brühl

Carlrichard Brühl (25 February 1925 – 25 January 1997) was a German historian of medieval history and philatelist who, in 1986, was awarded the Crawford Medal by the Royal Philatelic Society London for his Geschichte der Philatelie.

His main research focus in historical science was the Frankish Empire and the subsequent realms of France, Italy and Germany. Brühl wrote numerous studies on the economic basis of medieval kingship in a comparative European perspective, on the sites where rulers exercised their power, and on the travel routes of medieval rulers.

== Selected philatelic publications ==
- Geschichte der Philatelie. (Two volumes, 1985 and 1986) ISBN 9783487076188

== Selected historical publications ==
- Die Geburt zweier Völker. Deutsche und Franzosen (9.–11. Jahrhundert) 2001 ISBN 3-412-13300-0; (Deutschland – Frankreich. Die Geburt zweier Völker 1990 ISBN 3-412-18189-7; 1995 ISBN 3-412-08295-3)
- Fodrum, gistum servitium regis. Studien zu den wirtschaftlichen Grundlagen des Königtums im Frankenreich und in den fränkischen Nachfolgestaaten Deutschland, Frankreich und Italien vom 6. bis zur Mitte des 14. Jahrhunderts 1968 (= Kölner historische Abhandlungen. vol. 14, ZDB-ID 501363-x)
