= Sigurd Ringström =

Sigurd Ringström

Sigurd (Sigge) Ringström (Trelleborg 1908 – 16 August 1992) was a philatelist who signed the Roll of Distinguished Philatelists in 1977 at Blackpool. In 1982, with H.E. Tester, he was awarded the Crawford Medal by the Royal Philatelic Society London for parts I and II of The private ship letter stamps of the world.

== Selected publications ==
- The private ship letter stamps of the world. (With Henry E. Tester)
