= J. Schmidt-Andersen =

Danish philatelist (??–1976)

Johannes Schmidt-Andersen (died March 1976) was a Danish philatelist who in 1952 was awarded the Crawford Medal by the Royal Philatelic Society London for his work The postage stamps of Denmark 1851–1951. Gibbons Stamp Monthly called him "the Father of Danish philately". He signed the Roll of Distinguished Philatelists in 1950.

== Selected publications ==
- The postage stamps of Denmark 1851–1951. Copenhagen: The General Directorate of the Royal Danish Post Office, 1951. (Translated from the original Danish manuscript by Roland King-Farlow)
