= Nino Aquila =

Italian philatelist

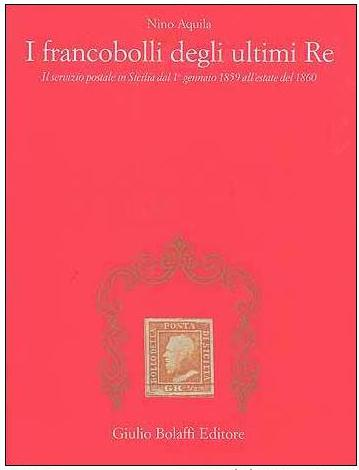
The cover of Aquila's Crawford Medal winning I francobolli degli ultimi Re.

Dr. Nino Aquila (died September 2013) was an Italian philatelist who, in 1990, was awarded the Crawford Medal by the Royal Philatelic Society London for his work I francobolli degli ultimi Re: Il servizio postale in Sicilia dal 1° gennaio 1859 all’estate del 1860. Aquila was an expert on the philately of Sicily.

== Selected publications ==
- I francobolli degli ultimi Re: Il servizio postale in Sicilia dal 1° gennaio 1859 all’estate del 1860. Italy: Giulio Bolaffi Editore, 1990.
