= Charles Nissen =

British philatelist (d. 1944)

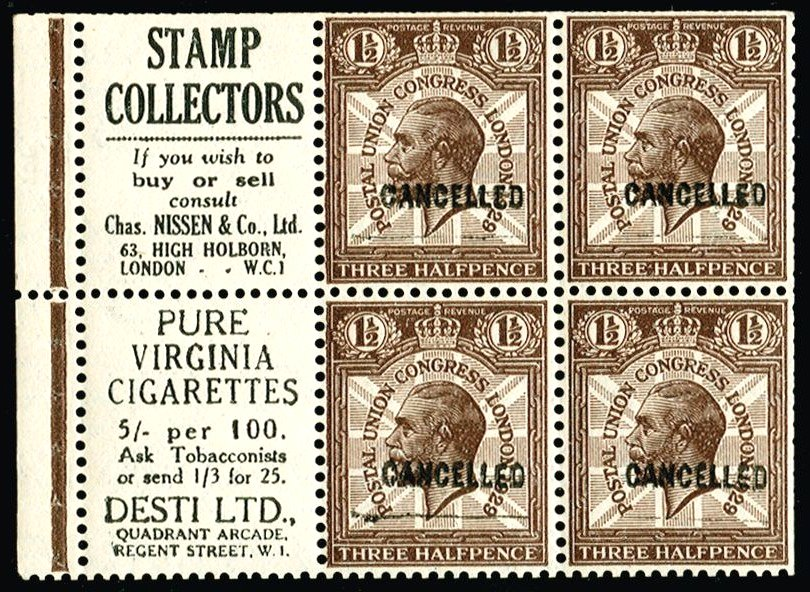
Advertising for Charles Nissen on a booklet pane from the 1929 PUC stamps of Great Britain.

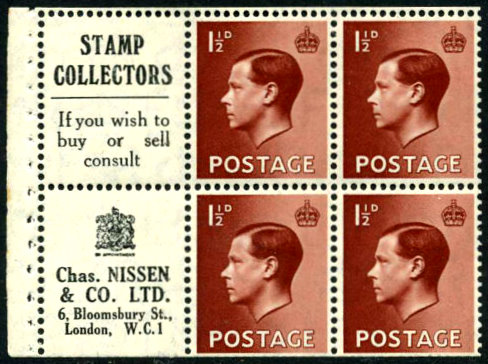
A 1936 Edward VIII booklet pane with similar advertising.

Charles Nissen (c.1880 – 13 March 1944) was a British philatelist, and stamp dealer who discovered the famous stock exchange forgery and wrote, with Bertram McGowan, the definitive book on the plating of the Penny Black.

== The Royal Philatelic Collection ==
He was instrumental in building the Royal Philatelic Collection and often acted as auction agent for King George V of the United Kingdom by whom he was awarded a Royal Warrant.

== The Perkins Bacon records ==
With Harry Nissen and Thomas Allen, Nissen purchased the Perkins Bacon records which were then acquired by The Royal Philatelic Society London.

== The Stock Exchange forgery ==
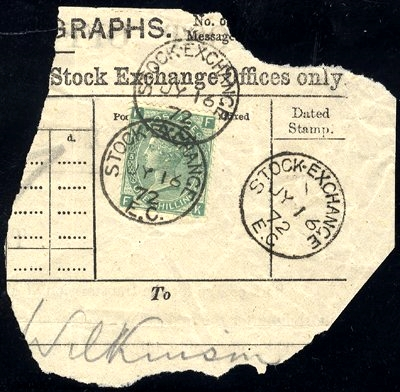
An example of the 1872 Stock Exchange Forgery discovered by Nissen.

Nissen discovered the Stock Exchange Forgery of 1872-73 in 1898 when examining used stamps from telegraph forms. The stamps were found to be forged due to the absence of a watermark and because they had impossible corner lettering. It is believed that a clerk in the Stock Exchange Post Office, London, had been supplementing his income by taking the one shilling telegram fees and using forged stamps instead.

== Organised philately ==
Nissen was an early member of the Fiscal Philatelic Society, and was appointed to the Roll of Distinguished Philatelists in 1923.

== Writings ==
In 1922 Nissen wrote, with Bertram McGowan, his masterwork The Plating of the Penny Black Postage Stamp of Great Britain, 1840 for which he received The Crawford Medal for philatelic literature from The Royal Philatelic Society London.

His firm, Chas. Nissen & Co. Limited continued after his death and enjoyed a Royal Warrant from Queen Elizabeth II as stamp dealers. Nissen also worked with McGowan on the plating of the Queen Victoria Penny Red and his work was eventually completed by J.B.M. Stanton and published after Nissen's death by his own firm.

== Publications ==
- The Plating of the Penny Black Postage Stamp of Great Britain, 1840, London 1922. (With Bertram McGowan)
- Official Stamps of Great Britain, London 1906. (With I.J. Bernstein)
