= Bertram McGowan =

- Born: 1874
- Died: 1950 (aged 75–76)
- Occupations: Solicitor; philatelist

Bertram McGowan (1874–1950) was a Scottish solicitor and philatelist who specialised in Chile and the Postage stamps and postal history of Great Britain, especially Great Britain used abroad.

McGowan worked with Charles Nissen on the plating of the Penny Black and the Penny Red and was the co-author with Nissen of The Plating of the Penny Black Postage Stamps of Great Britain, 1840, for which they received the Crawford Medal from The Royal Philatelic Society London in 1922. He was appointed to the Roll of Distinguished Philatelists the same year. McGowan and Nissen's work on the Penny Red formed the basis of the later work by J.B. Stanton which itself became the definitive work on that stamp. In 1923 he won a gold medal for his display of the Penny Red Die II at London.

In 1940 Robson Lowe held an auction sale solely devoted to McGowan's Penny Black collection which included 2146 lots, and after his death, his collection of Great Britain used abroad was also auctioned by Robson Lowe.

== Publications ==
- The Plating of the Penny Black Postage Stamps of Great Britain, 1840, London 1922 (With Charles Nissen).
