= A. M. Tracey Woodward =

Philatelist (1876–1938)

Alphonse Marie Tracey Woodward (Réunion, 1876–1938) was a philatelist who was a specialist in the stamps of Japan. In 1929, he was awarded the Crawford Medal by the Royal Philatelic Society London for his work The postage stamps of Japan and dependencies. He was also awarded the Lindenberg Medal.

The Japan collection of F.J. Peplow was acquired by Woodward after Peplow's death.

Woodward died on board ship on his way home from Shanghai. His collection of Japanese stamps was subsequently sold by H.R. Harmer in 1939.

== Selected publications ==
- A Summarized Catalogue of the Postage Stamps of Japan. In: Transactions of the Asiatic Society of Japan. Volume XXXIV: Part III (1906) 90p.
- The Postage Stamps of Japan and Dependencies. London: Harris Publications; Tokyo; Shanghai printed: S. Mayéba, 1928 (Two volumes of 537 pages and 243 plates). Reprinted by Quarterman Publications in 1976.
- The Syllabic and Numerical Cancellations of Japan: Part I. Oak Ridge, TE.: Martin R. Goodman, 1951? 20p.
