= Alan K. Huggins =

British philatelist (1936–2025)

Alan Keith Huggins MBE
- Born: May 1936
- Died: 27 June 2025 (aged 88–89)
- Education: King's College London
- Occupation: Philatelist
- Employer: University College London
- Known for: Keeper of the Roll of Distinguished Philatelists
- Awards: Crawford Medal (1981); Lichtenstein Medal (1994); Bacon Medal (2014); Tilleard Medal (2018)

Alan Keith Huggins MBE (May 1936 – 27 June 2025) was a British philatelist who in 1981, with Marcus Samuel, was awarded the Crawford Medal for his work Specimen stamps and stationery of Great Britain.

Huggins specialized in British postal stationery and had been a philatelic expert in the subject since 1980 and an AIEP (International Association of Philatelic Experts) member since 2001.

He signed the Roll of Distinguished Philatelists in 1983 and served as Keeper of the Roll from 2003 to 2008. He was an Honorary Fellow of the Royal Philatelic Society, London and received its Bacon Medal in 2014 and its Tilleard Medal in 2018. He received the Collectors Club’s Lichtenstein Medal in 1994, the FIP Medal for Service in 2004 and the FEPA Award for Service in 2009.

In the 1996 New Year Honours list, Huggins was appointed Member of the Order of the British Empire (MBE) for services to the British Philatelic Trust. This was the first occasion this honour was given within philately, other than those awarded directly by the monarch to the Keeper of the Royal Philatelic Collection.

Huggins was a one-time President of the Royal Philatelic Society London and also a one-time Chairman of The Postal Stationery Society (1992–1999).

Huggins was trained as a biochemist. His PhD thesis was titled Uncoupling reagents and intermediary metabolism in isolated tissues (1962; King's College School of Medicine and Dentistry). He followed a career as an academic and then as a University Administrator. He was Deputy Secretary at University College London from 1986 to 1990 and its Pro-Provost from 1997 to 2002.

Huggins died on 27 June 2025, at the age of 89.

== Philatelic publications ==
- British Postal Stationery: A Priced Handbook of the Postal Stationery of Great Britain. London: Great Britain Philatelic Society, London, 1970 188p.
- The De La Rue Punch Book. London: Robson Lowe, 1979 ISBN 0-85397-080-7 16p. (Published as a Supplement to The Philatelic Journal of Great Britain, June 1979.)
- (with Marcus Samuel) Specimen Stamps and Stationery of Great Britain. Safron Walden: G.B. Philatelic Publications Ltd., 1980 254p.
- The Origin, Development and Usage of British Postal Stationery in the Nineteenth Century; notes on a display presented to The Collectors Club, New York, Wednesday, 5 June 1991. London: The Author, 1991 8p.
- Competitive Exhibiting at Local and Federation Level. London: The Association of British Philatelic Societies Ltd, with support by the British Philatelic Trust, 2001 12p. Series Title: ABPS Booklet; No. 3.
- (with Peter Langmead) The Telegraph Stamps and Stationery of Great Britain 1851-1954. Putney: Published by GB Philatelic Publications Ltd. for the Great Britain Philatelic Society, 2003 ISBN 0-907630-14-6 190p.
- (with Colin Baker) Collect British Postal Stationery: A Simplified Listing of British Postal Stationery 1840 to 2007. Gerrards Cross: GB Philatelic Publications Ltd, 2007 ISBN 978-0-907630-22-7 151p.
- (with Edward Klempka) Great Britain: The 1840 Prepaid Parliamentary Envelopes. London: The Royal Philatelic Society London, 2013 ISBN 9780900631740 99p.
- (with Alan Holyoake) The Mulready Postal Stationery: Its Genesis, Production and Usage. Sutton Coldfield: GB Philatelic Publications, 2015 ISBN 9780907630296 211p.
