= Joaquín Galvez Naranjo =

Chilean philatelist

Joaquín Rafael Gálvez Naranjo (10 May 1902 – c. 1976 or 1977) was a Chilean philatelist. In 1965, he was awarded the Crawford Medal by the Royal Philatelic Society London for his work Los primeros sellos de Chile 1853 a 1867. At the time it was published, this book was the first significant work on the philately of Chile since 1919. The book was reprinted by Postilion Publications in the 1990s with an errata sheet and a prologue by Álvaro Bonilla Lara.

At the España 75 stamp exhibition, Galvez Naranjo won the Grand Prix d'Honneur for his entry "Chile".

His collection was sold by Corinphila in Switzerland in 1979.

He was born in La Serena, Chile. His father, Isidoro Gálvez Esquivel, was a lawyer and civil servant.

== Selected publications ==
- Los primeros sellos de Chile, 1853 a 1867. Santiago de Chile, 1964. In Spanish, English and French. Limited edition of 300 copies.
- "Postal markings from the colonial and the Republic Post Offices up to 1867" in Collectors Club Philatelist, November 1966.
- "1928-36 Surcharged air mail issues" in Aero Philatelist Annals, Vol. 17, No. 4, 1970.
