= A. Tort Nicolau =

Spanish medical practitioner and philatelist

Dr. Arturo Tort Nicolau (Tortosa, Catalonia, 30 April 1878 – Reus, 16 August 1950) was a medical practitioner and philatelist who was a specialist in the stamps of Spain. He founded the Gruppo Filatelico de Reus and was responsible for the then definitive three volume guide to Spanish stamps, the Guia del coleccionista de sellos de correos de España. In 1948 he was awarded the Crawford Medal by the Royal Philatelic Society London for the second volume of that work covering 1855–1869. The third volume was published after his death. He was appointed to the Roll of Distinguished Philatelists in 1956.

== Selected publications ==
- Guia del coleccionista de sellos de correos de España: Vol. I 1850-54. Barcelona: Gruppo Filatelico de Reus, 1935.
- Guia del coleccionista de sellos de correos de España: Vol. II 1855-69. Barcelona: Gruppo Filatelico de Reus, 1945.
- Guia del coleccionista de sellos de correos de España: Vol. III 1870-1900. Barcelona: Gruppo Filatelico de Reus, 1950.
