= S. D. Tchilinghirian =

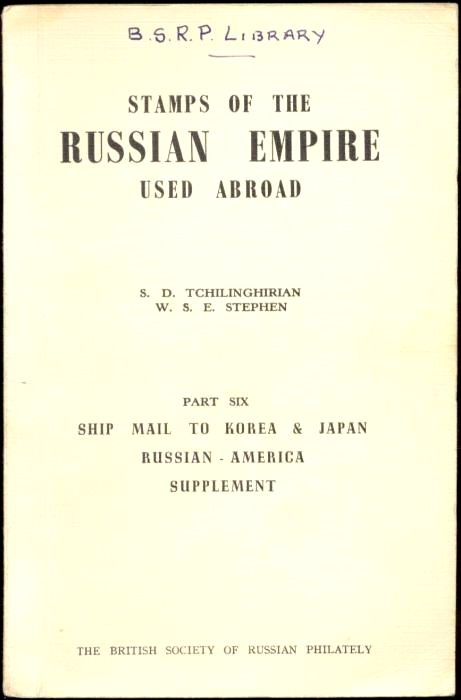
The cover of part 6 of Stamps of the Russian Empire used abroad by Tchilinghirian & Stephen.

Simon Dicran Tchilinghirian (died 1967) was a philatelist who in 1960, with W.S.E. Stephen, was awarded the Crawford Medal by the Royal Philatelic Society London for his work Stamps of the Russian Empire used abroad.

Tchilinghirian was a prominent member of the British Society of Russian Philately.

== Selected publications ==
- Austrian post offices abroad. Austrian Stamp Club of Great Britain. (With W.S.E. Stephen) (Seven volumes. Volume 8 by Keith Tranmer)
- Stamps of the Russian Empire used abroad. Aberlour, Banffshire: The British Society of Russian Philately. (multiple volumes)
