= Vittorio Mancini (philatelist) =

- Occupation: Philatelist

Vittorio Mancini is a philatelist who, in 1996, with Paolo Vollmeier, was awarded the Crawford Medal by the Royal Philatelic Society London for their Storia Postale del Regno di Napoli dalle Origini all'Introdzione del Francobollo.

== Selected publications ==
- Storia Postale del Regno di Napoli dalle Origini all'Introdzione del Francobollo (With Paolo Vollmeier)
- Le Collettorie Postali Delia Puglia. (With L. Ruggero Cataldi)
- Viceregno alla riforma del 1862. Istituto di Studi Storici Postali Prato, 2003. ISBN 88 85658 20 2
