= Anton Jerger =

Austrian philatelist

Dr. Anton Jerger of Vienna was an Austrian philatelist who, in 1983, was awarded the Crawford Medal by the Royal Philatelic Society London for his handbooks on the philately of Austrian Lombardy-Venetia. He amassed a world-class collection of this area over fifty years with his wife Elisabeth. The collection was sold in instalments by Corinphila, with the first instalment alone raising US$1,800,000.

In 1984, Dr. Jerger was the first Austrian to be elected to the Roll of Distinguished Philatelists.
