= Argenti =

Argenti is an Italian surname. Notable people with the surname include:

- Nicholas Argenti (1896–1961), British stockbroker
- Giosuè Argenti (1819–1901), Italian sculptor
- Christian Argenti (born 1975), Australian singer and radio presenter
- Filippo Argenti (13th century), politician and citizen of Florence

== See also ==
- Museo degli Argenti, better known as Palazzo Pitti, in Florence, Italy
