= James Bendon =

British stamp dealer

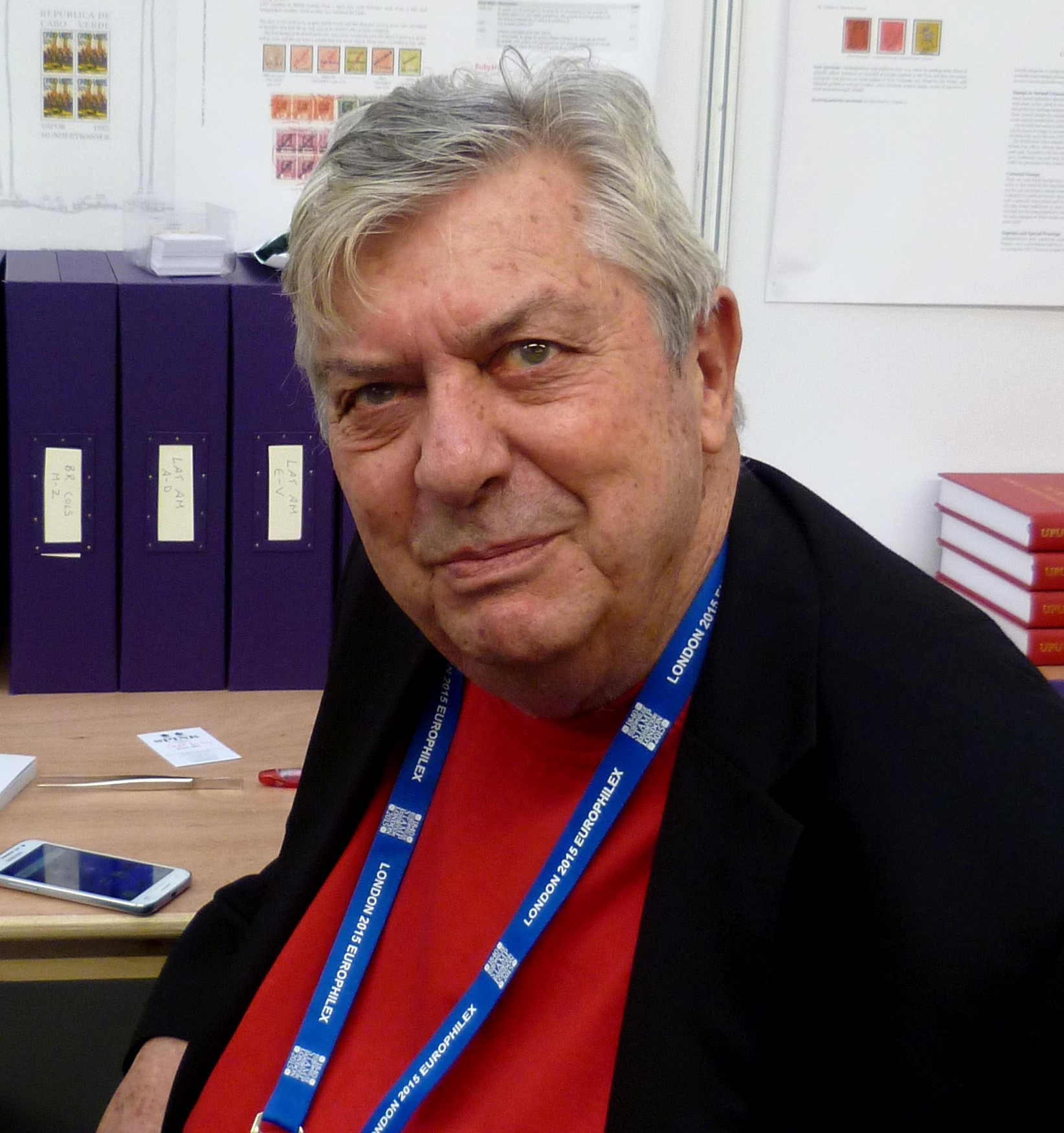
- Bendon in February 2016
- Born: 1937 (age 88–89)
- Occupation: Philatelist

James Bendon (born 1937) is a stamp dealer, publisher, and philatelist who is an authority on specimen stamps. He wrote and published the first worldwide catalogue of Universal Postal Union specimen stamps and subsequently published philatelic books by authors such as Robson Lowe and James Negus.

== Early life and family ==
James Bendon was born in 1937. In 1959 he married Kerstin B. Lindwall in Sweden and divorced in 1978. In 1980, he married Robyn L. Shenker in the Chelsea district of London. They divorced in 1993. He married Rida Adra in 1994 in Cyprus where he had been living. At present he and Rida live in London.

== Career ==
Bendon traded as a stamp dealer, first in the United Kingdom and later in Cyprus from where his first book on specimen stamps, UPU Specimen Stamps, was self-published in 1988. The book was the first worldwide account of the method of distribution of specimen stamps among the members of the Universal Postal Union, earlier works having concentrated on the stamps of Britain or British Commonwealth countries. In 2015, an updated edition was published with colour illustrations and expanded content including a reprint in an appendix of the pioneering article "The Distribution of SPECIMEN Stamps by the U.P.U." by Marcus Samuel that originally appeared in Stamp Collecting in 1964/65.

Encouraged by the success of his book on specimen stamps, from 1991 Bendon began to publish philatelic works by others, starting with James Negus's Philatelic Literature: Compilation Techniques and Reference Sources in 1991 which was followed the same year by a reprinting with a new introduction by Kenneth F. Chapman of the Harris index to philatelic literature edited by James Negus. In all, Bendon published nearly 50 books including a number of reprints of classic works, before he sold his stock of literature to Chris Komondy of Triad Publications.

Bendon became a member of the Royal Philatelic Society London in 1991 and was subsequently elected a fellow of the society.

== Own works ==
- UPU Specimen Stamps: The Distribution of Specimen Stamps by the International Bureau of the Universal Postal Union. Edited by James Negus. James Bendon, Limassol, Cyprus, 1988. ISBN 9789963762415
- UPU Specimen Stamps 1878–1961. Oxford Book Projects, 2015. ISBN 978-1870696050

== Selected works published ==
(All published by James Bendon in Limassol)

- Negus, James. (1991) Philatelic Literature: Compilation Techniques and Reference Sources. ISBN 978-9963762439
- Negus, James. (Ed.) (1991) The Harris Index to Philatelic Literature 1879–1925: Reprint Edition of The Standard Index to Philatelic Literature 1879–1925 with Additional Material. ISBN 9963762441
- Nishioka, Tatsuiji. 65 Years in Stamps: A Philatelic History of the Showa Period. ISBN 978-9963579679
- Van den Bold, W.E.J. (1994) Handbook of Thematic Philately. ISBN 978-9963579709
- Cohn, Ernst M. (1995) Ordinary Mail by Diplomatic Means during the Siege of Paris 1870–1871. ISBN 978-9963579723
- Lowe, Robson & Carl Walske. (1996) The Oneglia Engraved Forgeries Commonly Attributed to Angelo Panelli. ISBN 9963-579-73-6.
- Mackay, James A. (1997) Under the Gum: Background to British Stamps 1840–1940. ISBN 978-9963579761
