= Paolo Vollmeier =

Swiss philatelist

Paolo Vollmeier (3 October 1929–30 November 2017) was a Swiss philatelist who was elected to the Roll of Distinguished Philatelists in 1986.

In 1985, he was awarded the Crawford Medal by the Royal Philatelic Society London for his Storia Postale del Regno di Sardegna dalle Origini all'Introduzione del Francobollo. In 1996 he was awarded the medal again, this time jointly with Vittorio Mancini, for their Storia Postale del Regno di Napoli dalle Origini all'Introdzione del Francobollo.

== Selected publications ==
- Storia Postale del Regno di Sardegna dalle Origini all'Introduzione del Francobollo.
- Storia Postale del Regno di Napoli dalle Origini all'Introdzione del Francobollo (With Vito Mancini)
