= W. S. E. Stephen =

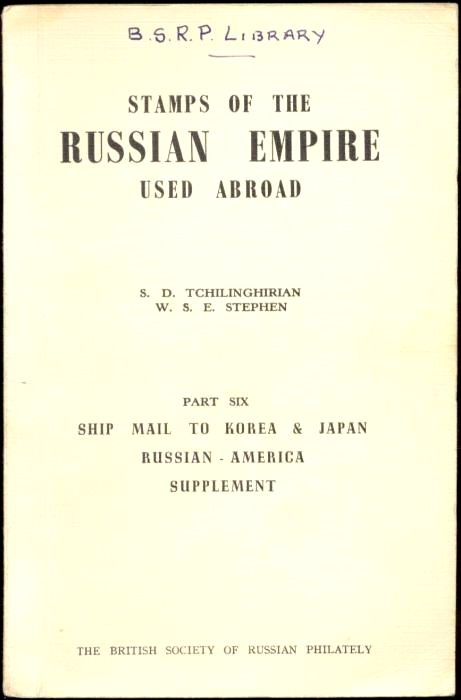
The cover of part 6 of Stamps of the Russian Empire used abroad by Tchilinghirian & Stephen.

William Stewart Easton Stephen (17 May 1903 Fraserburgh, Aberdeen, Scotland–16 May 1975 Aberlour, Banffshire, Scotland) was a philatelist who in 1960, with S.D. Tchilinghirian, was awarded the Crawford Medal by the Royal Philatelic Society London for his work Stamps of the Russian Empire used abroad.

He was also a co-author of Austrian post offices abroad which, like the work Russia, was also issued in parts.

== Selected publications ==
- Austrian post offices abroad. Austrian Stamp Club of Great Britain. (With S. D. Tchilinghirian) (Seven volumes. Volume 8 by Keith Tranmer)
- Stamps of the Russian Empire used abroad. Aberlour, Banffshire: The British Society of Russian Philately. (Multiple volumes)
