= Raymond Salles (philatelist) =

French philatelist

Raymond Salles (13 September 1899 in Paris – 25 January 1976) was a philatelist who was a specialist in French maritime mail. He was entered on the Roll of Distinguished Philatelists in 1974.

In 1973, Salles was awarded the Crawford Medal by the Royal Philatelic Society London for Volumes I-VIII of his work Encyclopaedie de la poste maritime Française historique et catalogue.

== Selected publications ==
- Encyclopaedie de la poste maritime Française historique et catalogue.
