= Patrick Pearson =

British philatelist (1930–2022)

Patrick Chilton Pearson VRD (20 March 1930 – 19 August 2022) was a British philatelist who signed the Roll of Distinguished Philatelists in 1974. He was Vice President of the Federacion Internationale de Philatelie.

Pearson was educated at Westminster School and Cambridge University where he graduated in law.

As a philatelist he specialised in the stamps of Hong Kong, Western Australia, Ceylon and Iraq. He was awarded the Royal Philatelic Society Medal in 1978 and the Mérite Philatélique Européen in 2004. He was elected President of the Royal Philatelic Society London from 1988 to 1990 and Vice-President of the Association International des Experts en Philatélie in 1999.

Pearson died on 19 August 2022, at the age of 92.

== Publications ==
- Advanced Philatelic Research. Arthur Barker Limited, 1971.
