= Stock Exchange forgery 1872–73 =

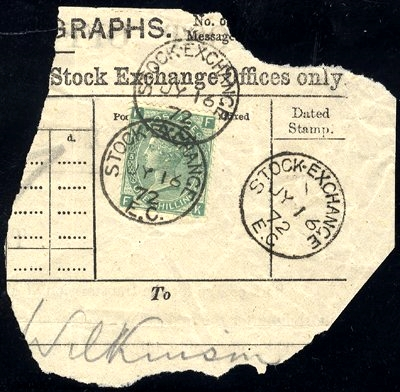
A forged 1 shilling stamp on part of a telegraph form.

The Stock Exchange forgery was a fraud perpetrated at the London Stock Exchange during the years 1872 to 1873. It involved forged postage stamps that were applied to telegraph forms and it was only detected over 25 years later.

== Description of the fraud ==
In 1870, the telegraph systems of the United Kingdom were nationalised and run by the Post Office. The development of the telegraph systems had been of great benefit to the Stock Exchange as stock prices could be quickly communicated. If those working at the Stock Exchange wanted to send a telegram they would, if they followed usual procedure, write their message on a telegram form and take it with payment of one shilling or more to a clerk who would then give them a 1 shilling green postage stamp to apply to it, with other stamps if needed to make up the correct fee, which depended on the number of words. The clerk then would cancel the stamp with a dated postmark, often heavily inked, to indicate that the appropriate payment had been made. However, cosy arrangements between companies that used large quantities of the one shilling stamps meant that the telegraph forms would be stamped and cancelled the following day in quantity so that the purchasers never saw them; the companies involved would pay an accumulated sum.

A clerk or clerks supplied forged stamps for the forms in order to steal the one shilling fees without depleting the stock of genuine stamps, which were subject to audit. The fraud was successful because the forged stamps, though not precise in every detail, were yet convincing enough and in any event were not retained by customers. After the telegraph message had been sent, the forms were stamped in private before being put in a bag for storage and eventual disposal. The stamps themselves, by an arrangement with the brokerage houses sending the telegrams, were not seen directly. Instead, for convenience and speed, the message forms were stamped and cancelled the day afterward before being bundled together in case they were subsequently required. Months or years after they would be destroyed. Thus the fakes were never subject to scrutiny. Whether such inspection would have resulted in exposure is, of course, impossible to know.

Precise details of the fraud are impossible to determine with certainty. From investigations carried out by Dr. Ian Ray, it seems likely that a head clerk named George E. Smith colluded with his subordinates T. H. Wright and Benjamin Hind to affix the bogus adhesives to forms. Almost four decades after the known dates when most of stamps were sold, Wright and Hind had died, but Smith was still alive, having retired from the post office in 1870s on the grounds of ill health. In 1910, A. J. Waldegrave, formerly Deputy Comptroller and Accountant General to the Post Office, interviewed Smith. Details of that interview have never been made public.

== Discovery of the fraud ==
The fraud was not detected at the time and could have remained undetected had all the stamps been destroyed as originally intended; however, they were retained by the Stock Exchange for a period, after which they were disposed of as waste paper. Some of the forms escaped this fate and eventually came into the hands of stamp dealers. The fraud finally came to light over 25 years later in 1898 when the young philatelist Charles Nissen noticed that the stamps he was examining lacked the "spray of roses" watermark they were supposed to have There were other discrepancies that came to light once Nissen noticed the inauthentic stamps.

- British postage stamps at the time included letters in the corners which indicated their positions on the sheet. Some of the forgeries used ‘impossible’ lettering that did not correspond with possible sheet positions. The letters were also slightly larger than on the genuine stamps and the corners were blunter. A second batch of forgeries, for plate 6, improved the sharpness of the corners and other details, but whoever was behind the fraud either failed to work out the combinations for the corner letters or did not think it necessary to do so.
- The genuine stamps, as Nissen saw, were on watermarked paper while the forgeries were not watermarked.
- The genuine stamps had a slightly crisper appearance. Formerly the forgeries were thought to be printed by lithography while the originals were typographed. Recent researches by Dr. Ray, in privately published catalogues for exhibitions, have revealed that the forgeries were actually printed one at a time by typography, like the originals, with interchangeable corner blocks to designate the letter sequences the British Postal Service had devised to prevent fakery. These protective measures proved ineffective. The fakes were still less expertly printed. However, since the bogus 1 shilling stamps were never to be seen, these defects were in a sense moot. There were forged versions of printing plates 5 and 6 of the stamp, with fewer examples of plate 6, which were better quality forgeries.

Several dates when the fraud was operating are apparent from the postmarks applied to the stamps. However, only eleven dates in June and July 1872 have been found, and it is almost certain that a scheme this elaborate was in operation for a much longer time than two months. It may have lasted until special stamps were designed for use on telegraph forms in 1876. As a large number of forged stamps were certainly made and as 1 shilling was a more significant sum at the time than it was later in the 19th and 20th centuries, it is likely that the fraud was highly profitable for the culprit(s), who were never identified in their lifetimes. The forged stamps, especially those from plate 6, are now worth more than the originals to collectors.

== See also ==
- Philatelic fakes and forgeries
