= G. C. van Balen Blanken =

Dutch philatelist

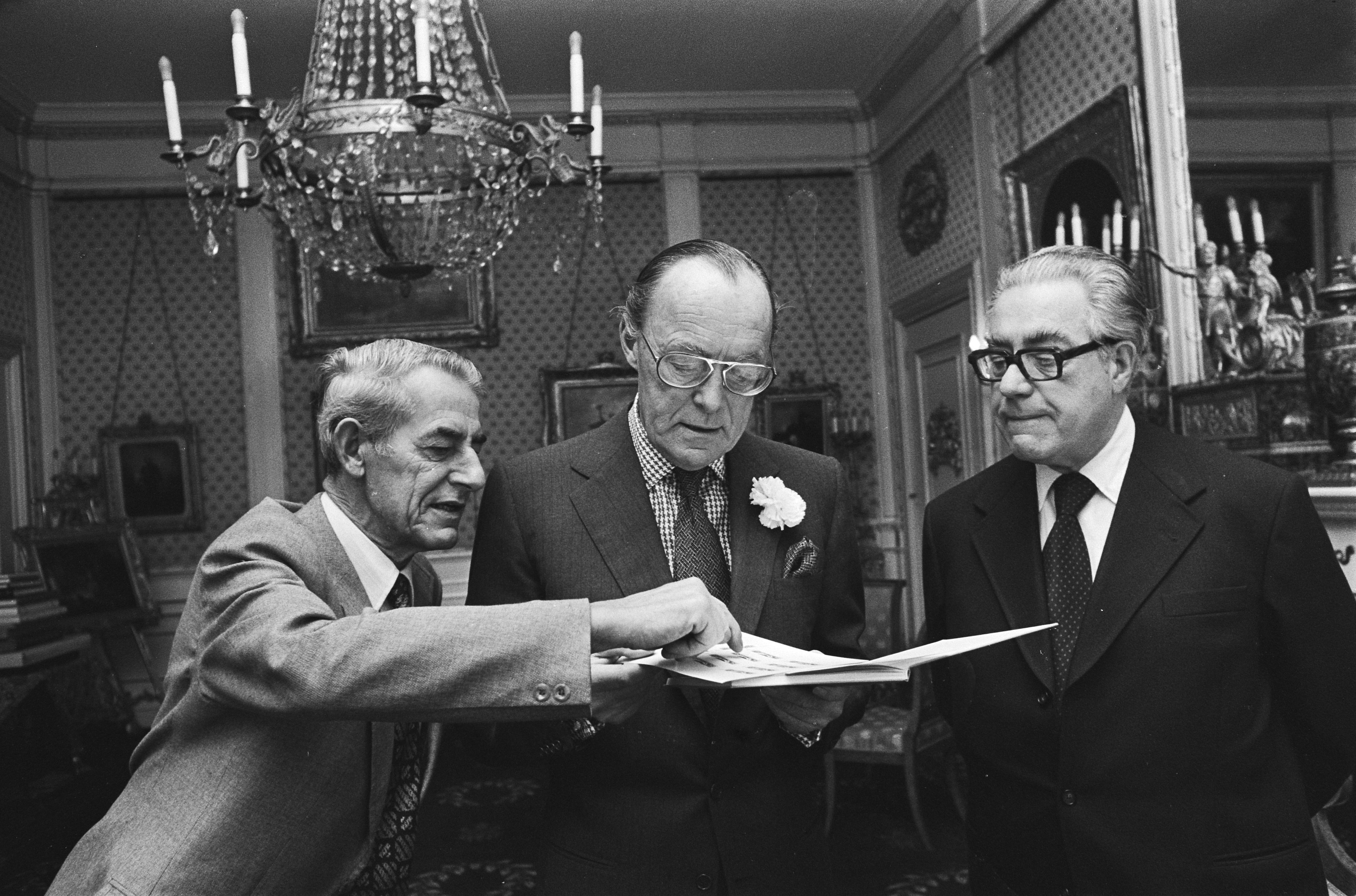
l.t.r. Bert Burrman, Prince Bernhard of Lippe-Biesterfeld, van Balen Blanken.

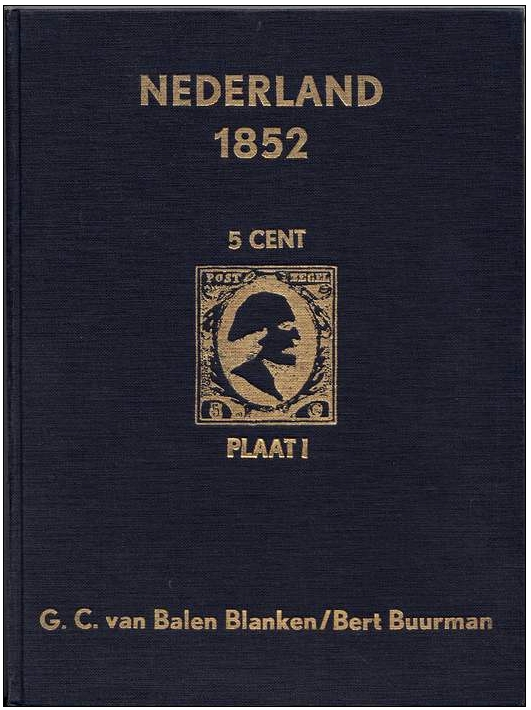
De cover of one of van Balen Blanken's volumes.

Dr. G. C. van Balen Blanken (10 September 1914 – 29 February 1984) was a philatelist who in 1975, with photographer Bert Buurman, was awarded the Crawford Medal by the Royal Philatelic Society London for his multi-volume work on the plating of the 1852 Netherlands 5 and 10 cent values (Amsterdam 1968–77). The work was composed of seventeen volumes each of which was 80 to 100 pages long and very copiously illustrated. It took nearly a decade to publish.
