= Armando Mário O. Vieira =

Philatelist

Armando Mário O. Vieira was a philatelist who, in 1984, was awarded the Crawford Medal by the Royal Philatelic Society London for his Selos classicos de relevo de Portugal. Viera was an expert in the classic embossed issues of Portugal.

== Selected publications ==
- Selos classicos de relevo de Portugal. Porto: Núcleo Filatélico do Ateneu Comercial, 1983.
