= Mohamed Dadkhah =

Iranian philatelist

Dr. Mohamed Dadkhah
- Born: 1910
- Died: 1980 (aged 69–70)
- Occupation: Physician
- Known for: Expert on the stamps of Iran and Bushire; Philatelic author Founder and life president of the Iranian Philatelic Society
- Honors: Crawford Medal (1961); Roll of Distinguished Philatelists (1964); APS Hall of Fame (1983)

Dr. Mohamed Dadkhah (1910–1980) was a world-renowned philatelist of Iran.

== Collecting interests ==
Dadkhah specialized in the collection of postage stamps of Iran and Bushire. He is known for his extensive collections, and his Iran presentation at the philatelic exhibition Philympia 1970 in London won him the gold award.

== Philatelic literature ==
Dadkhah, in 1960, wrote the book Emissions du Type "Lion" de l'Iran 1865-1879 (also entitled The Lion Stamps of Persia in English) and received the Crawford Medal for his effort.

== Philatelic activity ==
Dadkhah was active in the Iranian Philatelic Society which he founded, and remained president of, for the remainder of his life.

== Honors and awards ==
Dadkhah was awarded the Crawford Medal in 1961, and he signed the Roll of Distinguished Philatelists in 1965. In 1983, he was named to the American Philatelic Society Hall of Fame.

== See also ==
- Philatelic literature
