= Peter E. Fernbank =

British philatelist

Peter Edmund Fernbank is a philatelist who, in 1998, was awarded the Crawford Medal by the Royal Philatelic Society London for his King George V Key Plates of the Imperium Postage and Revenue Design.

== Selected publications ==
- King George V Key Plates of the Imperium Postage and Revenue Design. Banbury: West Africa Study Circle, 1997. ISBN 0952568721
