= Örjan Lüning =

Swedish philatelist

- Born: 30 May 1919
- Died: 24 September 1999 (aged 80)
- Occupation: Philatelist

Örjan Lüning (30 May 1919 − 24 September 1995) was a Swedish philatelist who was a specialist in aerophilately. In 1979 he was awarded the Crawford Medal for his work Luftpostens historia i Norden - The history of airmail in Scandinavia. His Large Gold Medal winning collection of pioneer flights and airmail of Scandinavia together with his Gold Medal collection of Denmark were sold by Corinphila in 2001.

He was also an architect, and his work was part of the architecture event in the art competition at the 1948 Summer Olympics.

== Selected publications ==
- Luftpostens historia i Norden - The history of airmail in Scandinavia. Stockholm: Sveriges filatelist-förbund, 1978. OCLC 6042138
