= H. E. Tester =

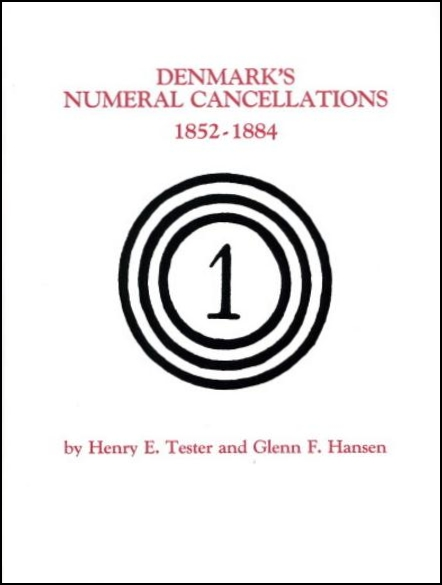
The cover of Denmark's numeral cancellations 1852-1884 by Tester and Hansen.

Henry E. Tester (1905 – 31 January 1986) was a Danish chemist and philatelist who, in 1982, with Sigurd Ringström, was awarded the Crawford Medal by the Royal Philatelic Society London for parts I and II of The private ship letter stamps of the world.

In his Will, Henry Tester donated three philatelic medals to the Royal Philatelic Society, his own Crawford Medal, his Amphilex 1977 Silver-Gilt medal and his 1982 Stampex Gold Medal.

== Selected publications ==
- The Literature on Cinderella Philately. Cinderella Stamp Club, 1972.
- The private ship letter stamps of the world. (With Sigurd Ringström)
- Denmark's numeral cancellations 1852-1884. Scandinavian Philatelic Foundation, 1987. ISBN 0936493119 (With Glenn F. Hansen)
- Suez Canal Company. (With Sigurd Ringström)
