= Brian Trotter =

British philatelist

- Born: Brian John Trotter; December 1943 (age 81–82)

Brian John Trotter (born December 1943) is a South African-born British philatelist who signed the Roll of Distinguished Philatelists in 2010. He was chairman of the London 2010 International Stamp Exhibition.

== Publications ==
- Bechuanalands & Botswana, postal marking classification (1995)
- Revenues of Southern Africa, Part 1: The Bechuanalands with Neville Midwood, (2003)
- The Edwardian Stamps of the South African Colonies (2004)
- Southern African Mails, Routes, Rates and Regulations 1806-1916 RPSL (2017)
