= Jane Moubray =

British philatelist

Jane Moubray is a British philatelist who was formerly president of the Royal Philatelic Society London. Moubray signed the Roll of Distinguished Philatelists in 1997.

Moubray was elected the first female President of the Royal Philatelic Society in 1996.
