= Benjamin Rogers-Tillstone =

British Royal Navy officer (1900–1973)

Captain Benjamin John Legge Rogers-Tillstone (30 March 1900 – 11 January 1973) was a British Royal Navy officer and philatelist who was added to the Roll of Distinguished Philatelists in 1970.
