= A. Ronald Butler =

British philatelist

Arthur Ronald Butler (1916 – 7 November 2003) was a British philatelist who was President of the Royal Philatelic Society London from 1978 to 1980. He was a specialist in the stamps of Australia and in 1978 was awarded the Crawford Medal for his work The departmental stamps of South Australia.

In 1975, at Leicester, Butler signed the Roll of Distinguished Philatelists.

== Outside philately ==
Butler was an engineer by profession, first working for the toy manufacturers Lotts Bricks. During World War II he served in the Royal Air Force, and afterwards joined the Royal Aeronautical Establishment at Farnborough. At this time he was involved in investigating crashes of the Comet aircraft.

In 1968 Butler worked for the Decimal Currency Board where he was involved in designing the shape of the British 50p piece.

== Selected publications ==
- The departmental stamps of South Australia. London: Royal Philatelic Society, 1978.
- The Roll of Distinguished Philatelists. The British Philatelic Federation Limited, 1990. (Addenda 1994 and 1999)
