= Peter M. Ibbotson =

Philatelist

Peter M. Ibbotson is a philatelist who, in 1991, was awarded the Crawford Medal by the Royal Philatelic Society London for his The postal history and stamps of Mauritius.

== Selected publications ==
- The postal history and stamps of Mauritius. London: Royal Philatelic Society, 1991. ISBN 0900631244
- The postal history and stamps of Mauritius. Revised edition. Newbury: Indian Ocean Study Circle, 1995. ISBN 0952640708
