= Bryan Kearsley =

British philatelist

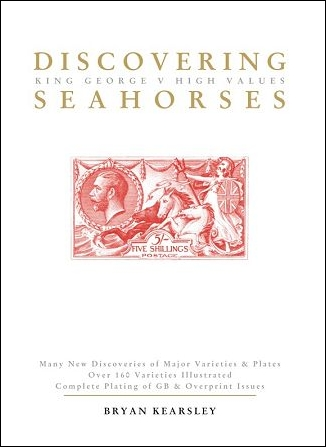
The cover of Discovering Seahorses.

Bryan Kearsley is a British philatelist who, in 2006, was awarded the Crawford Medal by the Royal Philatelic Society London for his work Discovering Seahorses – King George V high values. Kearlsey is an expert on the King George V Seahorse stamps of the United Kingdom.

== Selected publications ==
- Discovering Seahorses – King George V high values. Great Britain Philatelic Society, 2005. ISBN 0-907630-20-0
