= John Henry Levett =

British philatelist

John Henry Levett (8 August 1927 – 14 March 2008) was a British philatelist who was added to the Roll of Distinguished Philatelists in 1979. He was a president of the Royal Philatelic Society London.
