= Roger-Louis Loeuillet =

French philatelist

Roger-Louis Loeuillet is a French philatelist who was added to the Roll of Distinguished Philatelists in 1989.

Loeuillet has won the Grand Prix at Paris in 1964 and in London in 1970 for his displays of stamps and has edited and published the Ceres catalogues of France, French Colonies and Monaco.
