= Southern African Institute of Mining and Metallurgy =

Facility in Johannesburg, South Africa

Southern African Institute of Mining and Metallurgy arms and logo

The Southern African Institute of Mining and Metallurgy is a professional organisation for the mining and metallurgical industry in southern Africa.
