= Sidney Hands =

British philatelist

Lieutenant-Colonel Sidney Hands TD (3 June 1903 – 23 November 1991) was a British philatelist and president of the Royal Philatelic Society London 1973–1975. Hands was a specialist in the philately of Bolivia.
