= Hans Gottfried Dethloff =

Norwegian ophthalmologist

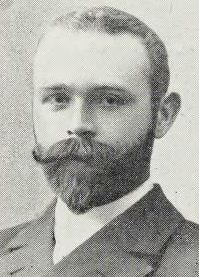
Hans Gottfried Dethloff

Hans Gottfried Dethloff (18 July 1871 – 15 January 1948) was a Norwegian ophthalmologist.

He was born in Kristiania as a son of merchant Frantz Heinrich Dethloff (1829–1894) and Johanne Andrea Mathilde Wang. He was a younger brother of philatelist Henrik Dethloff. In 1898 he married physician Elise Stoltz, thus becoming brother-in-law of Gerhard Stoltz.

He finished his secondary education in 1889 and graduated from the Royal Frederick University in 1897 with the cand.med. degree. From 1898 he was a practising ophthalmologist in his wife's hometown Bergen. He edited the journal Medicinsk Revy from 1907 to 1916, and was also a secretary for the Norwegian Association of the Blind and Partially Sighted from 1909. He was decorated as a Knight, First Class of the Order of St. Olav. He died in June 1938.
