= W. R. D. Wiggins =

British physician and philatelist (1913–1992)

FFARCS William Robert Denison Wiggins
- Born: 4 April 1913
- Died: 17 October 1992 (aged 79)
- Occupation: Philatelist
- Medical career
- Profession: Surgeon

Dr. William Robert Denison Wiggins FFARCS MRCS (4 April 1913 – 17 October 1992) was a British medical practitioner and philatelist who in 1963 was awarded the Crawford Medal by the Royal Philatelic Society London for his work The Postage Stamps of Great Britain Part II.

== Selected publications ==
- The Postage Stamps of Great Britain, Part 2: Perforated line-engraved issues, London: Royal Philatelic Society London, 2nd ed., 1962. (Editor)
- The plating of alphabet II : plates 1 to 21, AA to TL. 1974.
- British line engraved stamps : repaired impressions : 1855-1879, one penny die II. Robson Lowe, 1982.
