= Nicholas Argenti =

Nicholas André Ambrose Argenti (15 April 1896 – 12 April 1961) was a British stockbroker who served as a captain in the British Army during the First World War and a Squadron Leader in the Royal Air Force in the Second. He was at one time Chairman of the Nuclear Investment Company Limited.

== Philately ==
Argenti was a noted philatelist who in 1962 was posthumously awarded the Crawford Medal by the Royal Philatelic Society London for his work The postage stamps of New Brunswick and Nova Scotia, published after his death. The book had been intended to include postal history matters but that part had not been completed by the time Argenti died, and the Royal society decided to publish the parts it had in hand. He had been elected to the society in 1936.

Argenti's collection was sold by Harmer, Rooke & Co. in an auction on 7 and 8 November 1963, realising £42,214 in all.

== Selected publications ==
- The postage stamps of New Brunswick and Nova Scotia. London: Royal Philatelic Society London, 1962. ISBN 0-900631-06-6
