= William A. Townsend =

British philatelist

William Augustus Townsend (26 April 1904 – 10 February 1993) was a British philatelist who signed the Roll of Distinguished Philatelists in 1969.

Townsend was a specialist in the stamps of Montenegro, British West Indies, and British Guiana and received gold medals at international stamp exhibitions for British Guiana. He was awarded the Tilleard Medal by the Royal Philatelic Society London in 1967.

== Selected publications ==
- The Postage Stamps and Postal History of British Guiana. 1970.
