= Elise Dethloff =

Norwegian physician

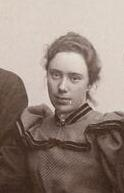
Elise Dethloff

Elise Dethloff, née Stoltz (3 February 1872 – 22 January 1931) was a Norwegian physician.

She was born in Bergen as a daughter of merchant Gerhard Stoltz (1833–1907) and Emma Wesenberg (1837–1919). She was a sister of Gerhard Stoltz and half-sister of Jørgen Brunchorst. In May 1898 she married ophthalmologist Hans Gottfried Dethloff (1871–1948), thus becoming sister-in-law of Henrik Dethloff.

She finished her secondary education in 1891 and graduated from the Royal Frederick University in 1897 with the cand.med. degree. From 1898 she was a practising physician in Bergen, together with her husband. She became nationally known for her endeavor against tuberculosis. She was decorated with the King's Medal of Merit in gold.

Elise Stoltz grew up in an old Bergen merchant family with German ancestry on both sides. She was, as she herself writes in the student book from the 25th anniversary (1916), a typical, genuine Bergen resident, and remained associated with her hometown all her life. After graduating from Artium in 1891, she traveled to Kristiania to study medicine, and became a cand.med. 1897. The following year she married her littermate H. G. Dethloff, and the same year they opened a medical practice in Bergen, he as an ophthalmologist, she as a general practitioner.

Elise Dethloff was one of the earliest cohorts of female doctors in Norway and, like many of her female colleagues, actually intended to specialize as a gynecologist. Through her half-brother Jørgen Brunchorst, however, she entered the circle around Bergens Museum, where the doctor Klaus Hanssen played a major role. Tuberculosis had by this time advanced to Norway's national disease no. 1, and Hanssen would try to eradicate it according to the same principles that his brother, Gerhard Armauer Hansen, had so successfully fought leprosy with. In this work, Elise Dethloff became his helper, and from 1910, when the National Association against Tuberculosis was founded, she became his secretary in it. For the sake of her private medical practice, she had to resign from this post as early as 1912, but she remained a faithful employee of the association all her life.

As a doctor, Elise Dethloff was most concerned with the general well-being of her patients. The group that she (according to her own words in the student book) included with particular interest and love, were the streaks - the hard-working and then poor people who lived by fishing in Øygarden west of Bergen. The Dethloffs had acquired a summer house there, which at the time was quite unusual, and initiated a number of welfare measures for the local population, who in gratitude erected a bauta over them on Rong in Øygarden.

Through her daily practice as a tuberculosis doctor, she gained contact, also more than purely professional, with patients from less affluent sections of society (it was mainly where tuberculosis ravaged) and became more politically interested, "driven towards socialism", as she herself wrote. But she was never going to play any active party political role.
