= Postal Stationery Society =

The Postal Stationery Society was formed on 26 September 1992 at an inaugural meeting held at the Union Jack Club, London., Starting in February 1993 the Society has published a Journal containing Society news and articles on all aspects of postal stationery. Initially the Journal was bi-annual and since 2002 it has been published quarterly.

== Publications ==
- Victorian Private Stationery Impressed with Embossed Stamps
- The Mulready Postal Stationery
- The Real Cost of the Penny Post
- A British Georgian Stamp Banned by the Postmaster General (a reprint of a pamphlet by Herbert Edgar Weston)
- The Jubilee of the Uniform Penny Post
- Great Britain Postage Rates Prepaid by Postal Stationery 1840 - 2004
