= Mike Argento =

American columnist and reporter (born 1958)

- Born: August 17, 1958 (age 67); York, Pennsylvania
- Education: Penn State (B.A.)
- Occupations: Columnist, reporter
- Notable credit: Former president of the National Society of Newspaper Columnists
- Spouse: Cine Martinez-Argento
- Children: Tony Argento
- Relatives: Dominick Argento (uncle)
- Website: www.yorkblog.com/mikeargento/

Mike Argento (born August 17, 1958) is an American columnist and reporter. He has been the columnist since 1989 as a night cops reporter. In the Kitzmiller v. Dover trial in 2004 and 2005, Argento's columns on the trial were cited by most media coverage of Kitzmiller v. Dover, including every book about the case. He is a past president of the National Society of Newspaper Columnists.

== Biography ==
Argento obtained his degree from Penn State with a degree in humanities. Upon graduating, he began working at a weekly newspaper, quit, then worked for another similar weekly newspaper.

Aside from writing, Argento spends his free time playing the guitar. He is a member of a band called JCFisher who play eclectic indie music. The band does a country version of the song "I Wanna Be Sedated".

Argento is married to his wife Cine Martinez-Argento and together the two live in York County, Pennsylvania. They have two dogs. One is a greyhound, named Lester, and the other is a mixed terrier named Shmuley. They have a number of cats named Crazy Ass and Crazy Ass Jr. Jr and also a large lizard.

== Awards and honors ==
He won best columnist (under 100k) award in 1998, the same year he won first place in the American Association of Sunday and Features Writers national features writing contest. In 1989, he was a featured writer.

== Novels ==
- Don't Be Cruel
