= Henrik Dethloff =

Norwegian philatelist

Henrik Dethloff (4 April 1867 – 18 June 1925) was a Norwegian philatelist who was a specialist in the stamps of Norway.

He was born in Kristiania, the son of merchant Frantz Heinrich Dethloff (1829–1894) and Johanne Andrea Mathilde Wang. He was the older brother of ophthalmologist Hans Gottfried Dethloff, and thus a brother-in-law of Elise Dethloff.

Dethloff received the Crawford Medal, jointly with Justus Anderssen, from the Royal Philatelic Society London in 1925 for his work Postage Stamps of Norway, 1855-1924 (Norges Frimerker, 1855-1924). He died in June 1925 in Oslo.

== Selected publications ==
- Norges Frimerker, 1855-1924. Kristiania filatelist-klubs, 1925. (With Justus Anderssen)
- Norges Frimerker, 1855-1914.Kirste & Sieberth Bok og Kunsttykkeri, 1915. (with Justus Anderssen)
