= Valentino Argento =

Italian fencer (1901–1941)

Personal information
- Born: 1901 Naples, Italy
- Died: 8 September 1941 (aged 39–40)

Sport
- Sport: Fencing

Valentino Argento (1901 – 8 September 1941) was an Italian fencer. He competed in the team foil competition at the 1924 Summer Olympics.
