= Manfred Nathan =

South African writer

Manfred Nathan (1875–1945) was a South African lawyer, judge, and writer. He served as President of the Special Appeals Court for Income Tax matters. Nathan was a member of the first executive of the South African Jewish Board of Deputies in 1912 and vice-president of the South African Zionist Federation from 1904 to 1907. He held political offices in the Transvaal. His historical writing and his biography of Paul Kruger were for many years standard references.

== Selected publications ==
- The Common Law of South Africa (1904–09)
- The South African Commonwealth (1919)
- Empire Government : An Outline of the System Prevailing in the British Commonwealth of Nations (London: Allen & Unwin, 1928).
- Not Heaven Itself (1944)
- The Voortrekkers of South Africa (1937)
- Paul Kruger (1941)
