= Thomas William Hall =

Thomas William Hall (1861 – 12 June 1937) was a British Solicitor and philatelist who signed the Roll of Distinguished Philatelists in 1921.
