= Tomas Bjäringer =

Swedish philatelist

Tomas Bjäringer HFRPSL is a Swedish philatelist who was added to the Roll of Distinguished Philatelists in 1978.

Bjäringer is the Royal Philatelic Society London's special representative for France. He is a specialist in the philately of Sweden, particularly the fakes and forgeries of that country. He also collects early philatelic literature. Bjäringer is a director of the Ringström Museum för Filateli.

== Selected publications ==
- Vad Portot kan Berätta om Brevens Väg: Demonstration av Några Långväga Försändelser. Stockholm: Tomas Bjäringer, 1969.
- Swedish letter rates to foreign destinations 1855-1895. Trelleborg: Skogs boktr., cop. 1986. (With Jan Billgren, Louis H Stone, Yngve Hellström, Vello Kallas.)
