= Christopher Harman =

British insurance broker and underwriter

Christopher Gill Harman is a British insurance broker and underwriter who is a name at Lloyd's of London.

Harman is a philatelist who was formerly president of the Royal Philatelic Society London. He signed the Roll of Distinguished Philatelists in 2003.
