= Marcus Samuel (philatelist) =

British philatelist (1904–1997)

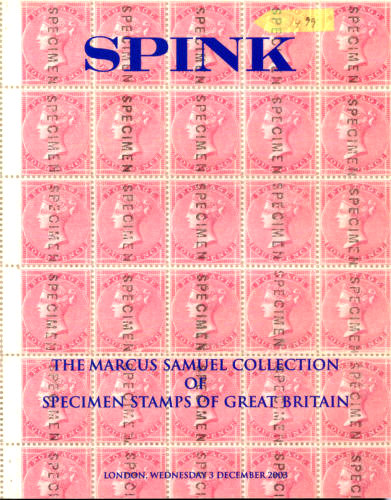
The catalogue for the sale of Samuel's collection of British specimen stamps. Spink, 2003.

Marcus Francis Javier Samuel (6 November 1904 – 16 October 1997) was a distinguished British philatelist who was an expert on the specimen stamps and revenue stamps of Britain and the British Commonwealth. He was a Fellow of the Royal Philatelic Society London.

== Early life ==
Samuel began collecting specimen stamps in 1924 when his father acquired a collection which contained many specimens. He was allowed to keep the specimens in return for removing the other stamps from the album. He subsequently formed a comprehensive collection of specimen stamps at a time when few other collectors were interested in them. Dealers were pleased to sell him their unwanted stamps and one was quoted as saying "The trouble with Marcus is that all his stamps are overprinted specimen".

== Professional life ==
In 1937 Samuel joined the Royal Philatelic Society, resigning when he became a professional philatelist with Robson Lowe after the end of World War II. In 1971 he retired and rejoined the Royal as a Fellow in 1972. During World War II he served in the RAFVR where he used his knowledge of wireless.

== Organised philately ==
Samuel was also a founder member of the Society of Postal Historians and an early member of the Cinderella Stamp Club.

== Awards ==
In 1981, with Alan K. Huggins, he won the Crawford Medal for his work Specimen stamps and stationery of Great Britain.

== Later years ==
The loss of his sight in the early 1990s caused Samuel to give up active philately.

== Selected publications ==
- Specimen stamps of the crown colonies, 1857-1948. London: Royal Philatelic Society London, 1976. (Supplement 1984)
- Specimen stamps and stationery of Great Britain. Safron Walden: G.B. Philatelic Publications Ltd., 1980. (With Alan Huggins)
