= George South (solicitor) =

British solicitor and philatelist (1916–1988)

George South (1916 – 24 July 1988) was a British solicitor and philatelist who signed the Roll of Distinguished Philatelists in 1974.
