= Henry Ibbotson =

Henry Ibbotson (1816? – 12 February 1886 in York), was an English botanist.

Ibbotson was a schoolmaster successively at Mowthorpe, near Castle Howard, at Dunnington, and at Grimthorpe, near Whitwell, all in Yorkshire. He was an industrious student of botany, but passed his last years in great penury, earning a scanty living by digging officinal roots for the druggists.

Ibbotson was an active contributor to Baines's "Flora of Yorkshire" (1840), to its supplement (1854), and to John Gilbert Baker's "North Yorkshire" (1863). He wrote a pamphlet on the ferns of his native county, 1884; but his chief production, a laborious compilation of all the synonyms of British plants known to him, entitled 'A Catalogue of the Phænogamous Plants of Great Britain,' came out in parts, from 1846 to 1848. He also distributed sets of the rarer plants of the northern counties; his collections obtained high praise from Sir William Joseph Hooker.
