= Harold W. Fisher =

British philatelist

Harold Wolf Fisher (born Crouch End, London 26 November 1903 - died 26 May 1986) was a philatelist who was a specialist in the line-engraved stamps of Great Britain. In 1980 he was awarded the Crawford Medal for the first four volumes of his work The Plating of the Penny and in 1981 he signed the Roll of Distinguished Philatelists. Fisher was also President of the Great Britain Philatelic Society.

An accountant by profession, Fisher founded the London firm of Chartered Accountants, HW Fisher. He was a Captain of the Fire Guard during the London Blitz but did not fight in either World War, being under-age in the first and in a reserved occupation in the second. He was Vice Chairman of the Hire Purchase Trade Association. Fisher was an accomplished draughtsman, making detailed drawings of stamp varieties and pen portraits of speakers during evenings out.

== Selected publications ==
- The Plating of the Penny. (Multiple volumes)
