= James Benjamin Seymour =

British philatelist (1867–1950)

- Born: 28 November 1867
- Died: 11 June 1950 (aged 82)
- Engineering career
- Institutions: International Philatelic Union; Royal Philatelic Society London l'Academie de Philatélie
- Projects: Created world famous collection of Great Britain stamps
- Awards: APS Hall of Fame; Roll of Distinguished Philatelists

James Benjamin Seymour (28 November 1867 – 11 June 1950), of Great Britain, was a philatelist who created an award-winning collection, and who wrote some of the key works in British philately.

== Collecting interests ==
Seymour collected stamps of Great Britain and created a collection of stamps and postal history of that country that won numerous awards at national and international exhibitions.

After his death, his collection was auctioned by Robson Lowe.

== Philatelic literature ==
James Seymour contributed the section on British line engraved stamps in the Kohl Briefmarken-Handbuch, published in Germany in 1923. He and the editor, Dr Herbert Munk jointly received the Sieger Medal in 1931 for the best philatelic work in the German language that year. Seymour was also the author of Stamps of Great Britain: The Line-engraved Issues, 1840 to 1853. He completed a revised edition of the book in 1950.

== Philatelic activity ==
Seymour was active within the philatelic community. He served both the International Philatelic Union and the Royal Philatelic Society London as president. And, at the l'Academie de Philatélie, he was elected as a corresponding member. Seymour was also a member of the Fiscal Philatelic Society.

== Honors and awards ==
James Benjamin Seymour received numerous philatelic awards from his and other countries. He signed the Roll of Distinguished Philatelists in 1931 and was named to the American Philatelic Society Hall of Fame in 1951.

== Outside philately ==
Seymour was a President of The Magic Circle.

== See also ==
- Philately
- Philatelic literature
