= Roll of Distinguished Philatelists of Southern Africa =

Formal list of stamp collectors

The Philatelic Federation of South Africa (PFSA) is responsible for inviting philatelists to sign the Roll of Distinguished Philatelists of Southern Africa (RDPSA) (originally the Roll of Distinguished Philatelists of South Africa).

The roll is modelled on the original Roll of Distinguished Philatelists established in Great Britain in 1921, and the first signatory to the South African roll was Gilbert J. Allis in 1932.

Election to the roll is by a vote at the PFSA congress.

Signatories include Robson Lowe, Adrian Albert Jurgens and Harvey Pirie.
