= Neil Ross McKinnon =

British barrister

- Born: c. 1850
- Died: 26 April 1909; Georgetown
- Occupation: Barrister
- Known for: First mayor of New Amsterdam; Owner of the British Guiana 1c magenta stamp

Neil Ross McKinnon KC (c. 1850 – 26 April 1909) was a British barrister resident in British Guiana (now Guyana). He was the president of the Board of Superintendence of New Amsterdam, and later the first mayor of that town. A stamp collector, he once owned the British Guiana 1856 1c magenta stamp, the only known copy of that stamp, which he bought from a local schoolboy for six shillings and sold five years later in England. The stamp sold in 2014 for US$9,480,000.

== Early life and family ==
Neil McKinnon was born in the mid-nineteenth century of Scottish descent. He qualified as a barrister of London's Middle Temple around 1885 and married Eugenie Bath Tait in London in 1887. They had three children, the third of which, Eileen Alice Kate, died of typhoid in 1906 at the age of 13.

== Career ==
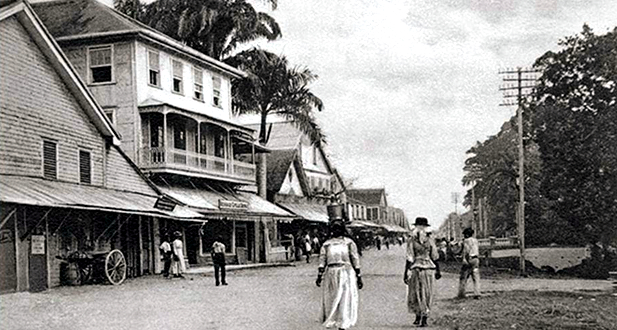
New Amsterdam in the 19th-century

McKinnon practised in British Guiana. In 1905 he was appointed King Edward VII's counsel for the Colony. He was also appointed Acting Solicitor General.

He was the president of the Board of Superintendence of New Amsterdam from 1889, and the first mayor of that town when it became a municipality on 1 September 1891; he framed the Town Council Ordinance and was the town's Financial Representative.

He was a member of the Royal Colonial Institute and a Freemason.

== Philately ==
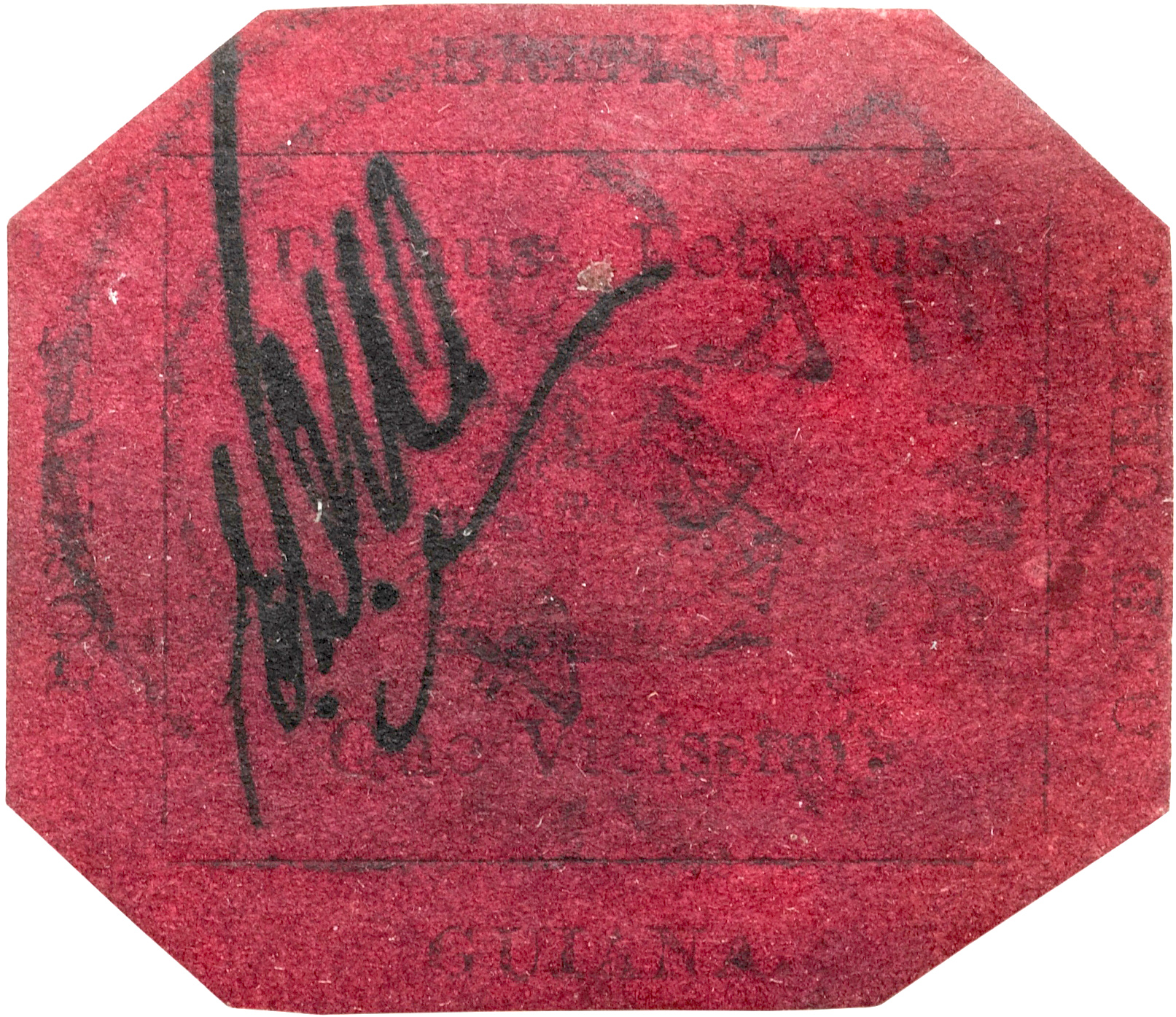
British Guiana 1856 1c magenta stamp

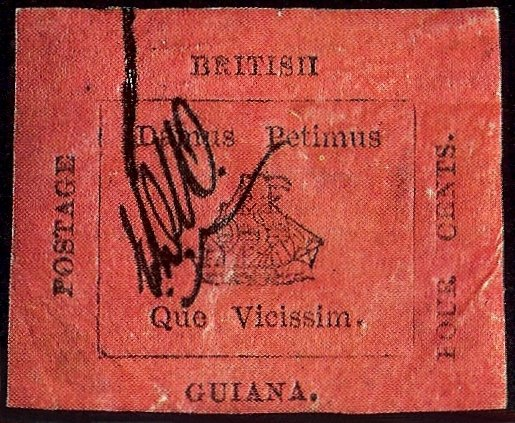
The design of the 1c stamp may be better seen in this image of the 4-cent stamp of the same issue

McKinnon was a collector of the stamps of British Guiana. In 1873 he bought the British Guiana 1856 1c magenta stamp for six shillings from a local schoolboy, Louis Vernon Vaughan. Vaughan had found the stamp among the effects of his uncle Andrew Hunter who had recently moved to Barbados. The stamp was probably on some sort of cover, possibly a newspaper wrapper, and soaked off by Vaughan. McKinnon initially did not want the stamp due to the clipped corners but changed his mind when he learned that Vaughan wanted to use the sale to buy other stamps that he had been sent on approval from England.

In addition to the 1c magenta, McKinnon owned all four known single used copies of the 1850 2c "cottonreel" stamps on rose-coloured paper.

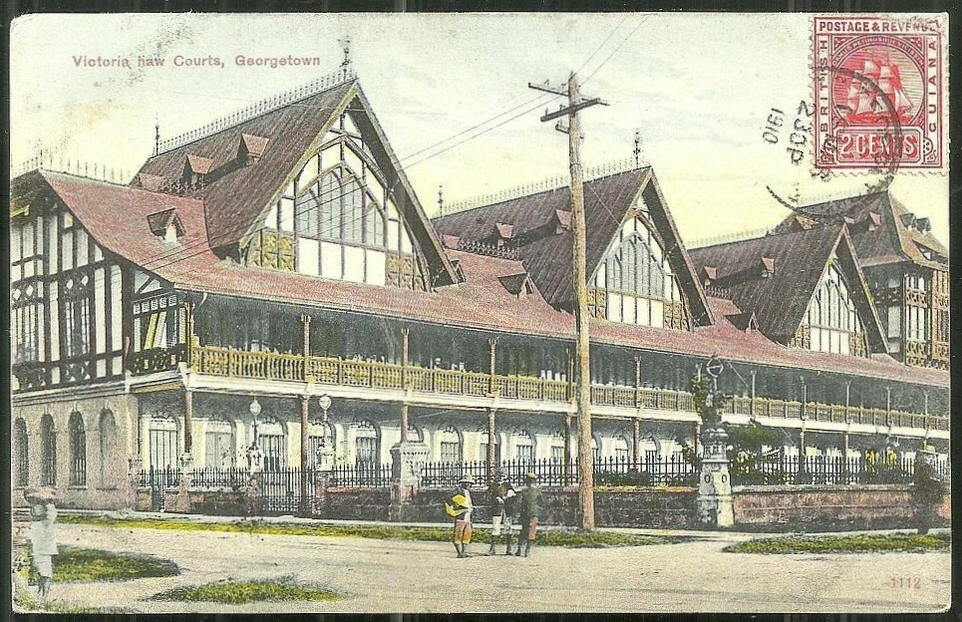
Victoria Law Courts, Georgetown, seen on a 1910 postcard.

In 1878 McKinnon sent his British Guiana collection, included the 1c magenta, to his friend Robert Wylie Hill in Glasgow for sale. McKinnon had probably met Hill a few years earlier when Hill was in South America on an expedition to collect exotic birds. Hill first offered it to Edward Loines Pemberton but no sale resulted despite Pemberton confirming later in a letter to Frederick Philbrick that he had examined the collection and that it included a "ONE cent, red [magenta], 1856!!! as genuine as anything ever was" but commenting that it was a "dreadfully poor copy". The collection was then offered by post to several other dealers and was bought by Thomas Ridpath for £120 who soon sold the 1c magenta to Philipp von Ferrary. The stamp was sold in 2014 for US$9,480,000.

After selling his collection, McKinnon apparently did not continue to collect stamps.

== Death ==
McKinnon died at Georgetown, British Guiana, on 26 April 1909.

== See also ==
- Postage stamps and postal history of British Guiana
