= Irwin Weinberg =

American philatelist and stamp dealer (1928–2016)

Irwin Weinberg

Irwin Robert Weinberg (10 February 1928 – 2 May 2016) was an American philatelist and stamp dealer who formed the syndicate of Pennsylvania businessmen who bought the British Guiana 1c magenta, the rarest stamp in the world.

== Early life and family ==
Irwin Weinberg was born around 1928 in Wilkes-Barre, Pennsylvania, the son of Samuel and Sara (Elkins) Weinberg. He graduated from E. L. Meyers High School. He married Jean Alice Tyrrell in 1952 (died 1998) and they had children Jan, Robert and John.

== Career ==
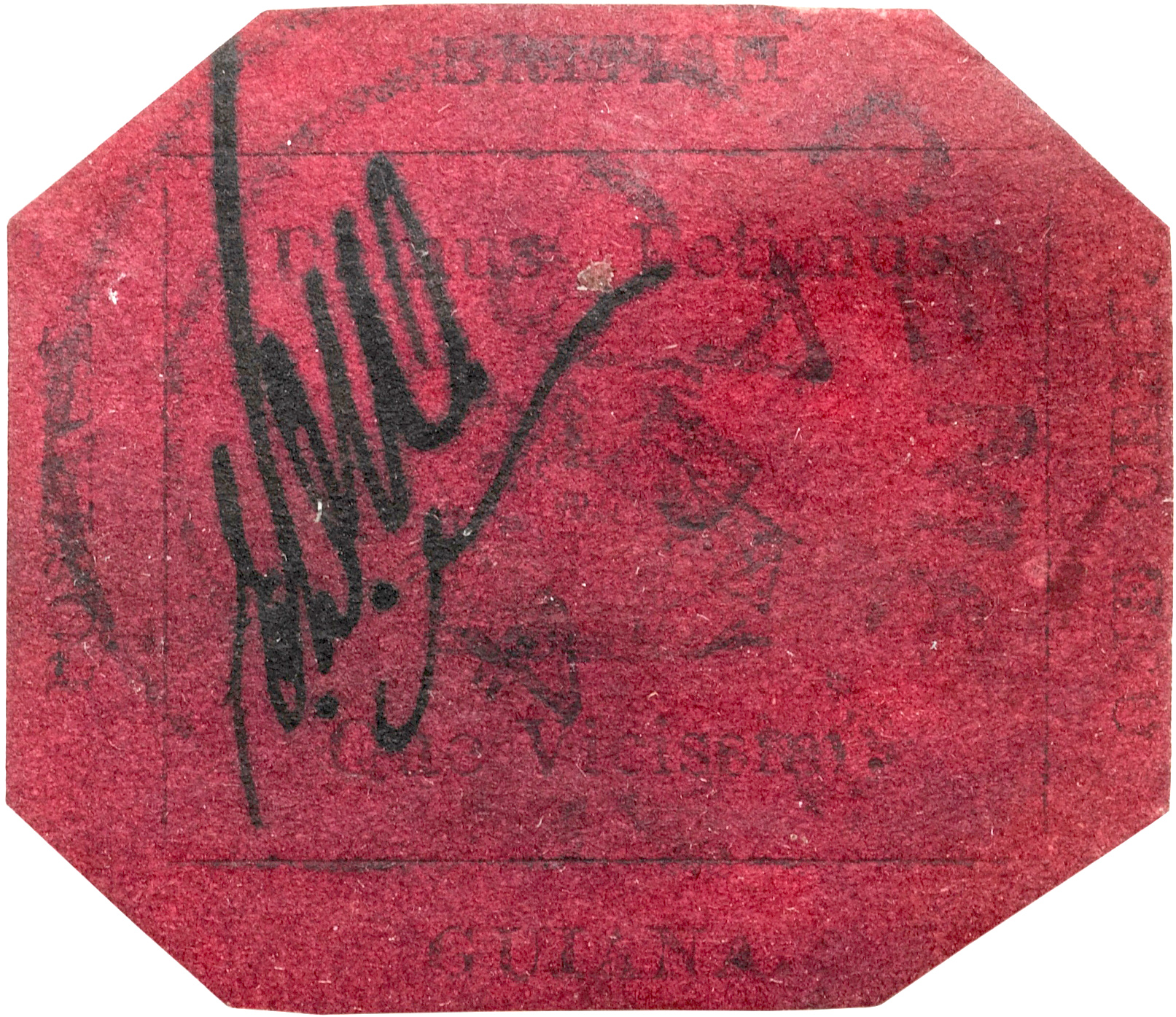
The British Guiana 1c magenta.

Weinberg first worked as an elevator operator in New York City before moving into philately. He had collected stamps since he was 12 years old. He issued his first weekly price list at age 18 which he produced on a mimeograph machine and he continued to produce the list, the Miner's Stamp News, in the same way for 70 years and to work without administrative assistance.

In 1970, Weinberg was one of nine investors who formed a syndicate to purchase the British Guiana 1c magenta, one of the rarest stamps in the world, for $280,000. He had first seen the stamp as a teenager at the New York World's Fair. After acquiring it, he added his initials "I.W." in pencil to the back of the stamp. He travelled widely to exhibit the stamp, carrying it in a locked briefcase to which he was handcuffed and accompanied by armed security. The publicity helped to enhance the cachet and value of the stamp and allowed it to be seen by the public. In 1978, at the Capex exhibition in Canada, the key to the handcuff broke off in the lock and a hacksaw failed to release him. A replacement key was eventually obtained. The consortium sold the stamp at a 1980 Robert A. Siegel auction to John E. du Pont for $935,000.

At different times, he bought four copies of the Inverted Jenny stamp of the United States.

He was a member of the board of National Postal Museum and was awarded an honorary Doctorate of Laws by the Dickinson School of Law. In 1995, U.S. Representative Paul E. Kanjorski gave Weinberg a salutation in the Congressional Record in which he hailed Weinberg's commitment to liberal causes. In 2009, he was inducted into the American Stamp Dealers Association's hall of fame.

== Death and legacy ==
Weinberg died at his home in Kingston, Pennsylvania, on 2 May 2016. His entire stock is to be sold in November 2016 in four auctions by the firm of Robert A. Siegel.
