= Arthur Hind =

Arthur Hind may refer to:

- Arthur Hind (industrialist) (1856–1933), American industrialist and philatelist
- Arthur Charles Hind (1904–?), Indian field hockey player who competed in the 1932 Summer Olympics
- Arthur Mayger Hind (1880–1957), curator at the British Museum and art historian of old master prints
