= Thomas Ridpath =

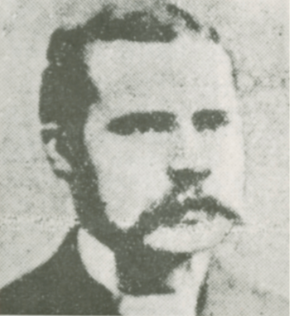
- Born: c. 1851
- Died: 28 October 1900 (aged 48–49)
- Occupation: Stamp dealer
- Known for: Selling the British Guiana 1856 1c magenta

Thomas Ridpath (c. 1851 – 28 October 1900) was a Liverpool stamp dealer who handled some of the greatest rarities in philately such as the British Guiana 1c magenta of 1856 and the block of four of the 1869 24c United States stamps with inverted centre. He gave philatelic lantern displays at which the differences between genuine and forged stamps were shown enlarged on a screen and supplied the philatelic press with reports of new finds that they reported in their columns.

== Early life and family ==
Thomas Ridpath was born in Lancashire around 1851 to William Ridpath, a tailor, and his wife Maria. He married Lydia and they had at least three children.

== Career ==
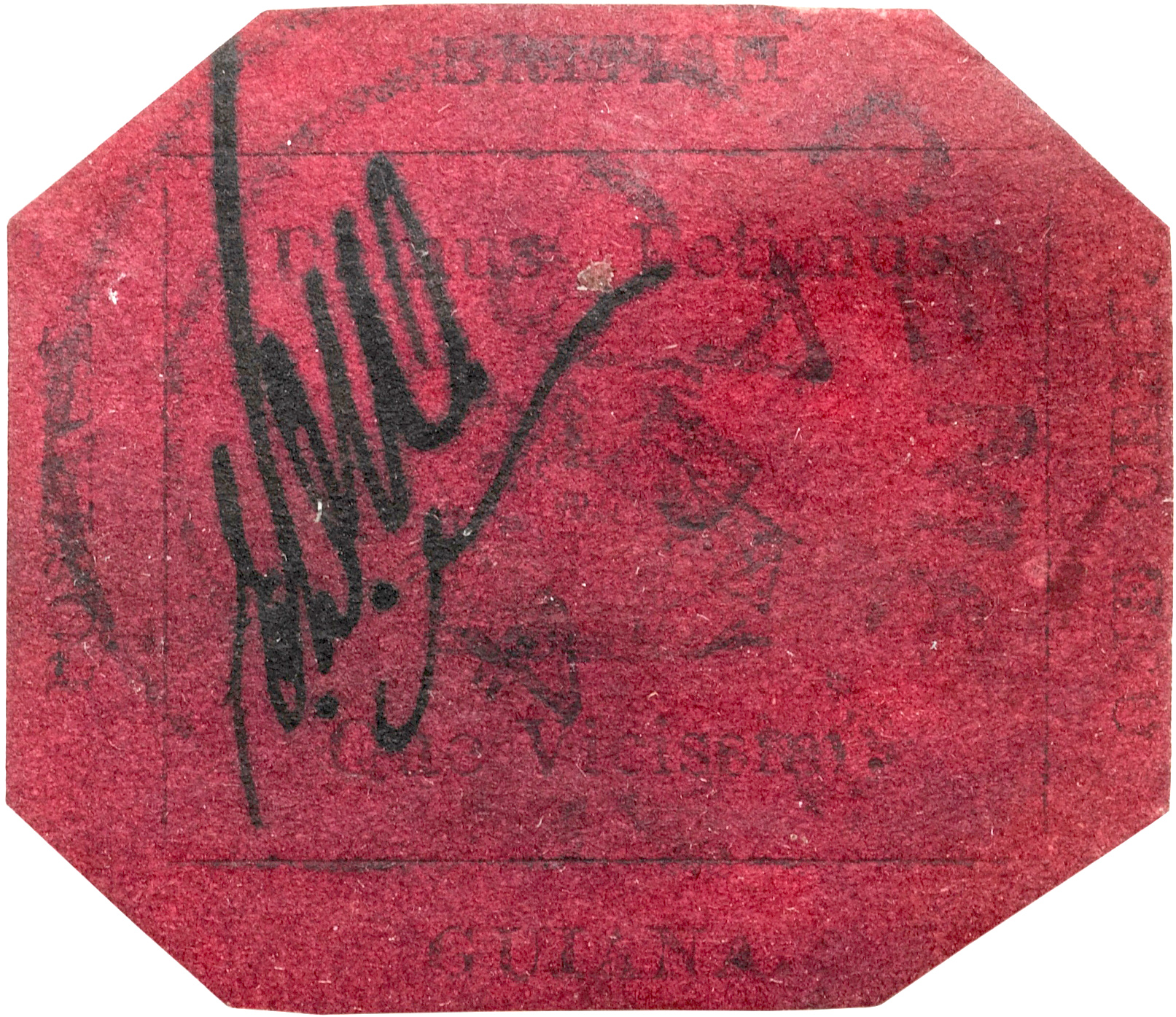
British Guiana 1856 1c magenta stamp

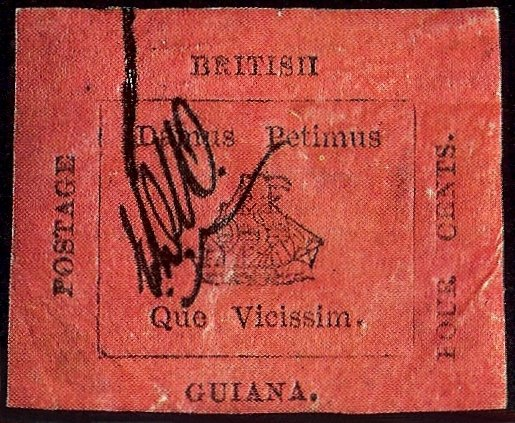
The design of the 1c stamp may be better seen in this image of the 4-cent stamp of the same issue

Ridpath began his career as a stamp dealer in the firm of Young and Stockall but went into business on his own account in 1877. He described himself in censuses as an "importer of foreign goods". He was active in informing the philatelic press of new stamps that they then reported in their columns. Trading from Liverpool's Church Street, he handled some of the greatest rarities in philately:

=== British Guiana 1c magenta ===
In 1878 he bought the collection of the British Guiana collector Neil Ross McKinnon which included the unique British Guiana 1856 1c magenta. McKinnon had placed his collection in the hands of his friend Robert Wylie Hill in Glasgow who first offered it to Edward Loines Pemberton but no sale resulted despite Pemberton later confirming in a letter to Frederick Philbrick that he had seen the collection and that it included a "ONE cent, red [magenta], 1856!!! as genuine as anything ever was" but commenting that it was a "dreadfully poor copy".

Hill then offered the collection by post to several other dealers including Ridpath who, with funding from his client James Botteley of Birmingham, purchased the collection for £120. As Ridpath described it to Edward Denny Bacon in a letter: "I received my letter at 4.45 p.m., and at 8 p.m. I was on the way to Glasgow. I saw Mr. Hill by 9 a.m. next morning, concluded the business, and was back in Liverpool all within twenty-four hours." Meanwhile, Pemberton had sent a cheque by post but it arrived after Ridpath's visit.

As the financer of the deal, Botteley was offered his pick of the collection but was asked not to take the 1c magenta as Ridpath already had it in mind to sell it in Paris to Philipp von Ferrary which he did for a price that may have been £40 or £150. Neither Ridpath nor Botteley seems to have appreciated the full significance of the 1c. Ridpath may not have realised it was unique and Botteley did not want it because the corners were clipped. It was sold in 2014 for US$9,480,000.

=== 1869 24c United States inverted centre ===
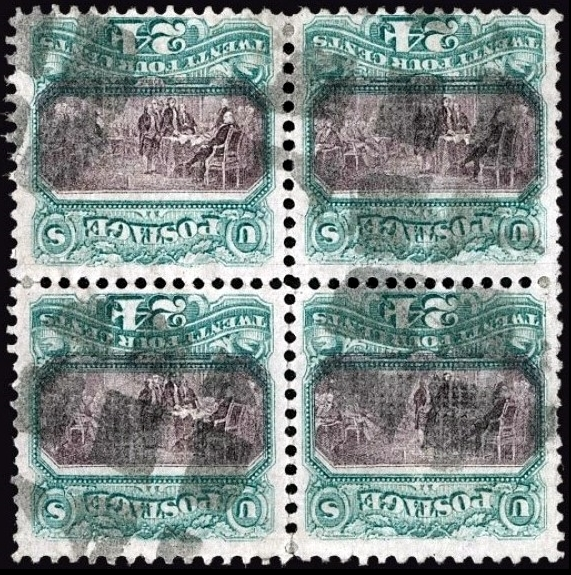
The block of four of the 1869 24c United States stamps with inverted centre sold by Ridpath.

Around 1888 he bought for £5 the unique block of four of the 1869 24c United States stamps with inverted centre. The block had been discovered in a Liverpool merchant's files around 1888 by someone known to local dealers only as the "Upside Down Man". He sold it to Henry Collin of the Scott Stamp and Coin Co. who sold it to the New York collector William Thorne. The block was sold in 2018 for US$625,000 from the William H. Gross collection.

The idea that the block was originally of 3 vertically by 2 horizontally, with a pair separated by Thorne, has been dismissed as the only known invert pair does not match the surviving block of four.

=== Organised philately ===
In September 1893, Ridpath gave the Manchester Philatelic Society a "limelight exhibition" in which photographic images of stamps were shown on a screen at a magnification of 1000 times. The society's proceedings record that "The greatest possible interest was centred in the exhibition, not only on account of its novelty—it being the first ever given in Great Britain—but also on account of the ease with which the most dangerous forgeries may be analyzed, and the points in which they differ from the genuine stamps made a note of."

The display was so successful that Ridpath was elected an honorary member of the society at the end of the meeting. The detailed analysis of the physical characteristics of stamps such as paper, watermark, printing and perforation became a specialism of the Manchester society which prided itself on its scientific approach which became known as the Manchester School of philately. In 1897, Ridpath gave a philatelic lantern display at the London Philatelic Exhibition.

== Death ==
Ridpath died at Bedford Street, Liverpool, on 28 October 1900. He left an estate of £1,985 with probate granted to his wife Lydia.

== See also ==
- Walter Dorning Beckton
