= Ridpath =

Ridpath may refer to:

== People ==
- Bruce Ridpath (1884–1925), Canadian ice hockey player
- George Ridpath (died 1726), Scottish journalist and author
- Ian Ridpath (born 1947), English science writer, journalist, astronomer
- John Ridpath (1936–2021), Canadian objectivist philosopher, lecturer, historian, author
- John Clark Ridpath (1849–1900), American educator, historian, and editor
- Michael Ridpath (born 1961), English author
- Thomas Ridpath (1851–1900), English stamp dealer

== Other ==
- Ridpath Junior Public School, Lakefield, Ontario, Canada
- Ridpath Hotel, Spokane, Washington, United States, an apartment complex
