= The Gilded Man (comics) =

- First edition cover by Barks
- Story code: W OS 422-02
- Original title: "Donald Duck and "The Gilded Man""
- Story: Carl Barks
- Ink: Carl Barks
- Date: September–October 1952
- Hero: Donald Duck
- Pages: 32
- Layout: 4 rows per page
- Appearances: Huey, Dewey and Louie; Gladstone Gander; Philo T. Ellic; Old River Man; The Gilded Man
- First publication: Four Color #422

"The Gilded Man" is a 32-page Disney comics story written, drawn, and lettered by Carl Barks. The story was first published by Dell in Four Color #422 (September–October 1952) with a cover by Barks, and three Donald Duck gag stories by Barks: "Stable Prices", "Armored Cat Rescue", and "Crafty Corner". "The Gilded Man", the cover, and the gag stories have been reprinted many times.

"The Gilded Man" is one of Barks's ever-popular comic book adventure/treasure hunting stories. In these sorts of stories, Barks sends the ducks off to exotic locations in search of treasure. The Gilded Man is based on the centuries-old legend of El Dorado.

The main characters in the story are Donald Duck, his nephews Huey, Dewey and Louie, and his cousin Gladstone Gander. Minor characters include Philo T. Ellic, The Old River Man, and The Gilded Man. Barks created the fictional U.S. state of Calisota as the location of Duckburg in this story.

The story references the world's most valuable stamp, the legendary 1856 British Guiana 1c magenta, which in 2014 was auctioned for $9,480,000. The stamp was on display at the National Postal Museum of the Smithsonian Institution in Washington, D.C. through November 2017 where a copy of the Barks comic was prominently displayed next to the stamp itself. The stamp was also displayed at the World Stamp Show-NY 2016 in New York City from May 28 to June 3, 2016.

== Plot ==
Donald Duck is a knowledgeable stamp collector. His lucky cousin Gladstone finds a stamp album belonging to Philo T. Ellic, a rich collector in Duckburg. Ellic rewards Gladstone and Donald with $1,000 each. Donald uses his reward to finance a trip to British Guiana to search for an old stamp worth $50,000. He plans to sell this stamp to Ellic. Donald's nephews are eager for the adventure.

A long search in British Guiana for the stamp proves fruitless. The Old River Man tells the Ducks that the mysterious Gilded Man has one of the stamps. He directs the Ducks to a location where the Gilded Man was last seen. The Ducks trek far into the jungle, and discover an Aztec-style temple. Here, they encounter the fierce Gilded Man and his army of natives.

The Ducks are thrown into an underground chamber. They recall the Old River Man telling them that the Gilded Man was "nutty" about silver because there was none in his land. The boys have a bottle of silver paint in their gear. They loosen a pillar, and the two-ton Gilded Man crashes through the ceiling. The boys paint him silver. He is thrilled by this. The Ducks escape with the stamp.

At home, the Ducks learn (to their dismay) that Gladstone Gander is the rightful owner of the precious stamp. He sells it to Philo T. Ellic for $50,000. Ellic makes hurried plans to display the stamp in San Francisco, but absentmindedly leaves the stamp on a bridge in Duckburg as he climbs into a taxi. Donald finds the precious stamp, and is rewarded by Ellic with $50,000.

== Reception ==
Matthias Wivel writes, "'The Gilded Man' elegantly brings together several of Barks' key concerns as an artist. It is a nimbly paced, lushly staged yar, spun over the vagaries of fortune and the question of the moral imperative, leavened by colonialist tension." He notes that the one-cent magenta stamp is real, embedding the quest for adventure in a materialist system. "As he often does, Gladstone Gander personifies the arbitrariness of this system, idly receiving the benefits of Donald's ever-honest efforts, snatching success from him time and again. The story thus integrates Barks' paramount concern with moral action in an absurd world into an explicitly materialist framework, anticipating the thematic structure of many a great Scrooge tale to come."

== See also ==
- List of Disney comics by Carl Barks
