= Robert Wylie Hill =

Scottish department store founder (1851-1939)

- Born: c. 1851
- Died: 1939 (aged 87–88)
- Occupation: Department Store Owner
- Known for: Founding Glagow department store R. Wylie Hill & Co and selling the British Guiana 1856 1c magenta

Robert Wylie Hill (c. 1851–1939) was a Scottish importer and retailer who founded the R. Wylie Hill & Co. department store in Glasgow.

== Stamp selling ==
In the mid-1870s, Wylie Hill was in South America on an expedition to collect exotic birds. It was probably then that he met Neil Ross McKinnon of British Guiana, who was of Scottish descent, and who later entrusted Wylie Hill with the sale in Britain of his valuable collection of the postage stamps of the colony that included the famous British Guiana 1c magenta stamp.

== R. Wylie Hill & Co ==
Wylie was born into a famous retail family, with his grandfather, Robert, and great-uncle, William Lochhead, partners in the Glasgow firm of Wylie & Lochead furniture emporium. Previously working at Glasgow firm Stewart & Hill, his first solo venture was in 1879 when he formed R. Wylie Hill & Co., commission merchants. In 1880 he opened American & Continental Stores in Argyll Street which sold a selection of imported goods. By 1883, he had opened R. Wylie Hill & Co. at 20-24 Buchanan Street with his brother. However, in November 1888 the building burnt down, but was rebuilt to designs by John Hutchinson, with elements designed by Charles Rennie Mackintosh. The building was again damaged by fire in November 1903. Wylie Hill retired from the business in 1925. In 1947 the company bought the Glasgow department store of Bow's Emporium, which for twenty years had a strong relationship with members of the Bow family sitting on the board. The company expanded their Buchanan Street store in 1954 by buying the neighbouring Cranston Tea Rooms. In 1960, the company reported that it had made a net profit of £115,995. The company owned the Perth-based chain Playpen, a retailer of children's bags, safety straps, walking reins and sports holdalls. The business was purchased by newsagent group John Menzies in 1973. The store was closed in 1974 after being sold off to Prudential for more than they had purchased the company for. Menzies also sold off subsidiary Chalmers of Oban, which had only been bought prior to their take-over. The building was listed as Category B by Historic Environment Scotland in 1970.

== Personal life ==
Wylie Hill was married to Isabella Muir Rowat, the cousin of embroidery designer Jessie Newbery. In 1894 he purchased the 1700-acre Balthayock Estate near Perth, where he raised prize-winning shorthorn cattle.
