= Shunkichi =

- Gender: Male

Origin
- Origin: Japanese
- Meaning: Different meanings depending on the kanji used

Shunkichi (written: 俊吉 or 駿吉) is a masculine Japanese given name. Notable people with the name include:

- Shunkichi Hamada (浜田 駿吉; 1910–2009), Japanese field hockey player
- Shunkichi Kikuchi (菊池 俊吉; 1916–1990), Japanese photographer
