= British Guiana 1c magenta =

Rare stamp famous for only having one extant example

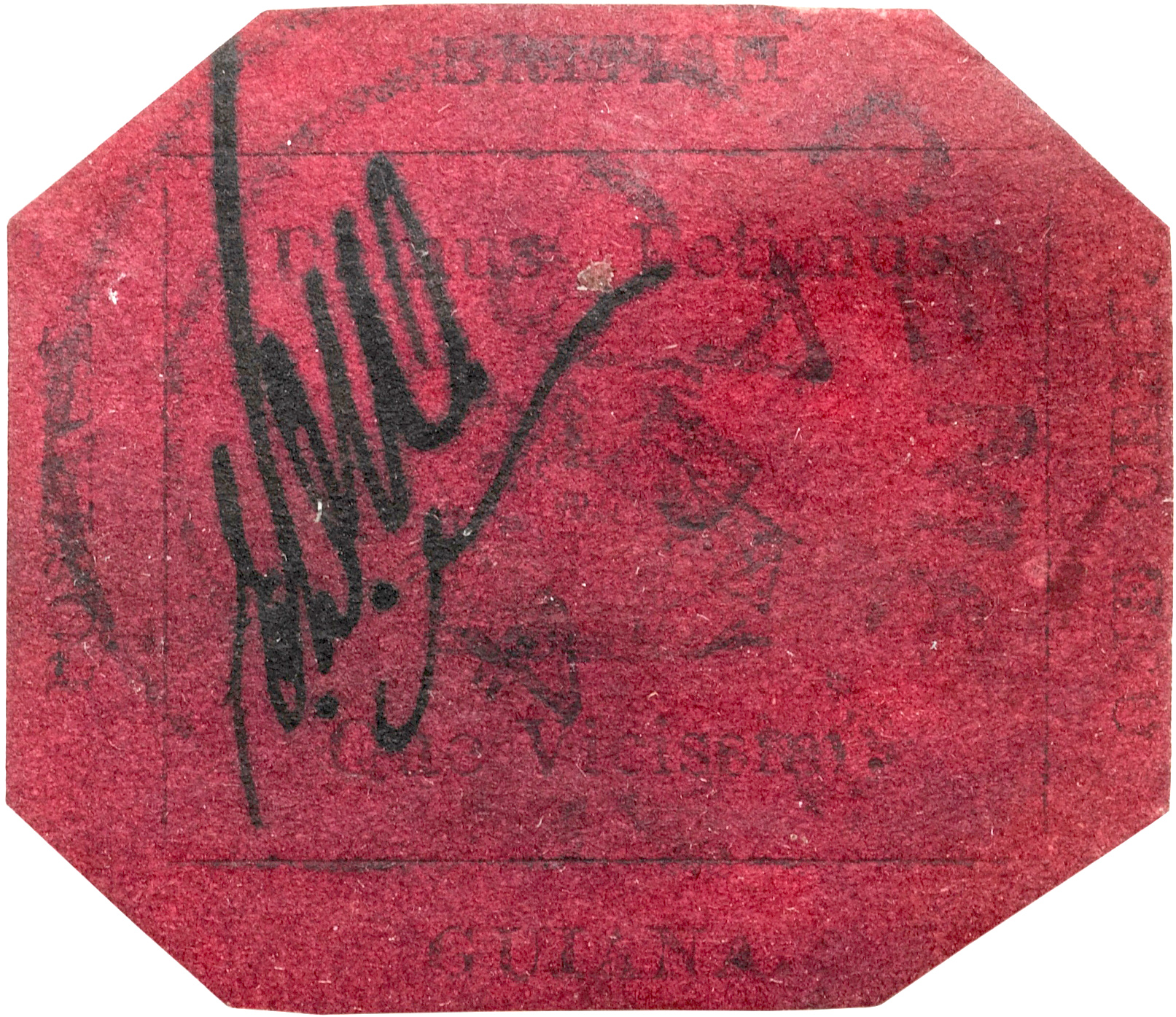
- Country of production: British Guiana (now Guyana)
- Location of production: Georgetown
- Date of production: 1856
- Nature of rarity: Very limited printing; Emergency issue; Only one known
- No. in existence: 1
- Face value: 1c
- Estimated value: US$8,307,000 as of last sale on 8 June 2021 (including buyer's premium)

The British Guiana 1c magenta is regarded by many philatelists as the world's most famous rare stamp. It was issued in limited numbers in British Guiana (now Guyana) in 1856, and only one specimen is now known to exist. It is the only major postage stamp ever issued in the United Kingdom or British Commonwealth that is not represented in Britain's Royal Philatelic Collection.

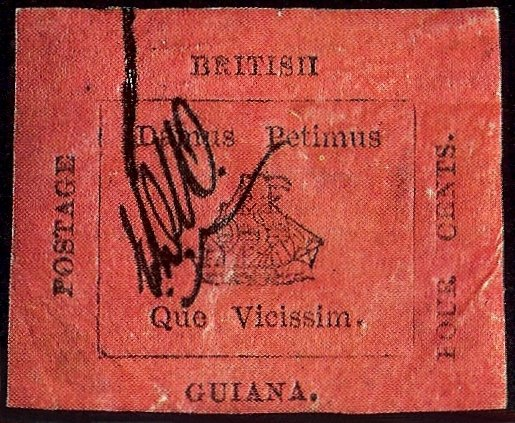
An example of the 4-cent stamp of the same issue

It is imperforate, printed in black on magenta paper, and it features a sailing ship along with the colony's Latin motto "Damus Petimus Que Vicissim" (We give and expect in return) in the middle. Four thin lines frame the ship. The stamp's country of issue and value—rendered in black uppercase lettering—surround the frame.

Neil McKinnon, a local collector in Guiana, purchased the only known example of the stamp in 1873 after first declining to buy it. A Liverpool dealer, Thomas Ridpath, recognized its rarity and purchased it in 1878. Noted collector Philipp von Ferrary acquired the stamp that same year, and owned it in France for several decades. It was seized by the French government at the end of World War I, auctioned in Paris in 1922 for a world record sum, and then spent years in the hands of American owners. It was exhibited at the 1939–40 World's Fair, and was also shown at the London International Stamp Exhibition in 1923. King George V saw the stamp at this exhibition, and is said to have declined an offer to own it, although he had previously sent his agent to the Paris auction.

With its sale in June 2014 to Stuart Weitzman for $9,480,000, the 1c magenta has broken the world record for a single stamp auction price a total of four times. The stamp was next sold in June 2021 to London stamp dealer and publishing company Stanley Gibbons PLC for $8,307,000.

It is estimated to be the world's most valuable artefact by size and weight, valued at over $276 million per gram based on its 2021 sale price.

== Background ==
The 1c magenta was part of a series of three definitive stamps issued in 1856 and was intended for use on local newspapers. The other two stamps, a 4c magenta and 4c blue, were intended for letter postage. The issue came about through mischance. An anticipated delivery of stamps by ship did not arrive so the local postmaster, E. T. E. Dalton, authorized printers Joseph Baum and William Dallas, who were the publishers of the Official Gazette newspaper in Georgetown, to print an emergency issue of three stamps. Dalton gave some specifications about the design but the printer chose to add a ship image of their own design to the stamps. Dalton was not pleased with the result and as a safeguard against forgery ordered that all correspondence bearing the stamps be autographed by a post office clerk. This particular stamp was initialled E.D.W. by clerk Edmond D. Wight.

== Description and history ==
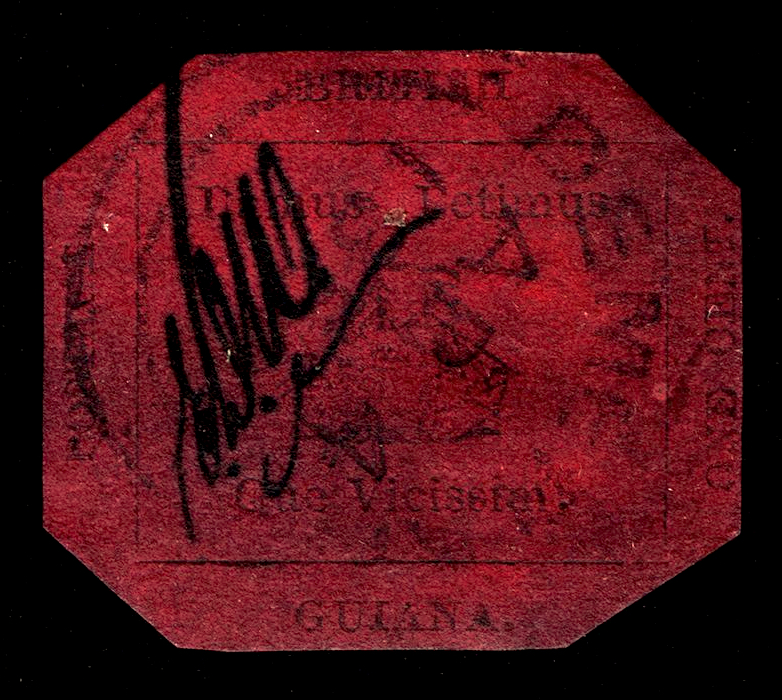
Slightly enhanced image of the stamp

Only one copy of the 1c stamp is known to exist. It is in used condition and has been cut in an octagonal shape. It is unknown why the four corners were clipped; both clipped and un-clipped examples remain of the 4-cent issue. A signature, in accordance with Dalton's policy, can be seen on the left-hand side, along with a heavy postmark.

The stamp was bought on or before 4 April 1856, the date it is postmarked. It was discovered in 1873 by a 12-year-old Scottish schoolboy, Louis Vernon Vaughan, in the Guyanese county of Demerara (whose postmark the stamp bears), amongst his uncle's letters. There was no record of it in his stamp catalogue so he sold it some weeks later for six shillings to a local collector, Neil Ross McKinnon. In 1878 McKinnon's collection was sold to a Liverpool stamp dealer, Thomas Ridpath, for £120. Shortly afterwards in the same year, Thomas Ridpath sold the 1c to Philipp von Ferrary for about £150. Ferrary's massive stamp collection was willed to a Berlin museum but following Ferrary's death in 1917, the entire collection was taken by France as war reparations following the end of World War I.

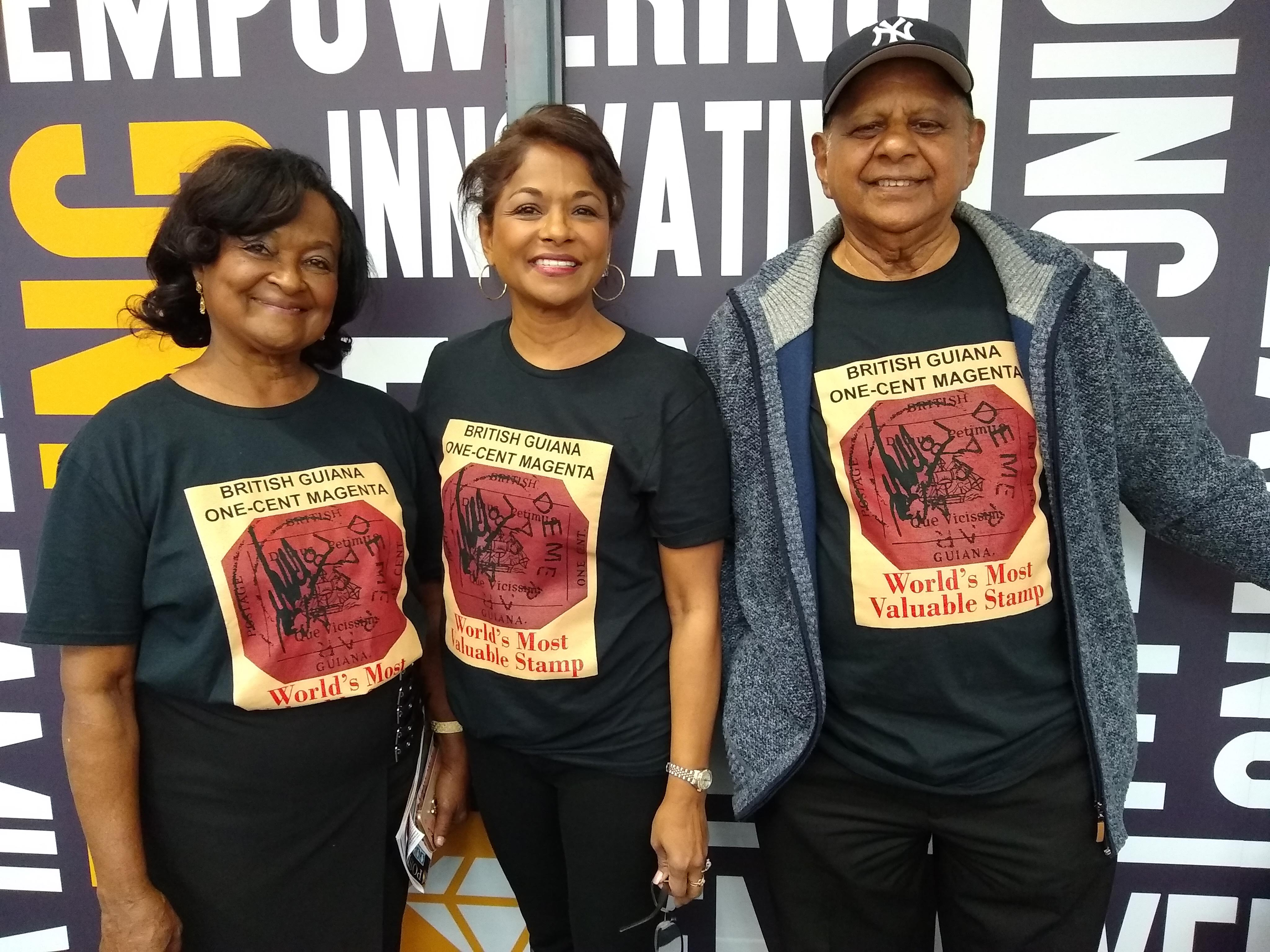
Members of the Guyana Philatelic Society with T-shirts displaying the stamp

Arthur Hind bought the stamp in Paris in April 1922, at one of the auctions of Ferrary's possessions, for over $32,000—reportedly outbidding three kings, including George V, whose agent was at the sale. On 6 April 1922, during sale 3, lot 295, the stamp sold for 300,000 francs with a 17.5% French sales tax, making a total of 352,500 francs, the world record stamp sale. The price had been generally estimated at between 165,000 and 220,000 francs. The stamp's first ever public viewing took place two days earlier, on the afternoon of Tuesday, April 4.

Hind enjoyed "owning the world's most valuable stamp," he "freely gave interviews," and "frequently loaned the stamp for exhibitions." It was shown at the London International Stamp Exhibition from 14 to 28 May 1923, an event opened by George V. Supposedly, Hind offered King George the stamp, who "politely declined." Later, Hind "recalled His Majesty congratulated him on his purchase." The exhibition marked the first time the stamp had been in Britain since 1878.

On 30 October 1935 it was offered for sale at Harmer Rooke & Co auction 2704, lot 26, where a bid of £7,500 was received from Percival Loines Pemberton. However, the lot was withdrawn and returned to Mrs. Scala (formerly Mrs. Hind). In 1940, she offered it for private sale through the philately department of Macy's department store in New York City. It was purchased for $40,000 by Fred "Poss" Small, an Australian-born engineer from Florida, who had wanted to own the stamp since he first heard about it as a boy. In acquiring it, Small completed a full set of stamps from British Guiana.

In 1970, Small auctioned his entire stamp collection (estimated to be worth $750,000), and the 1c stamp was acquired by a syndicate of Pennsylvanian investors, headed by Irwin Weinberg, who paid $280,000 for it and spent much of the decade exhibiting it in a worldwide tour.

John E. du Pont bought the stamp for $935,000 in 1980, setting the world's record for a single stamp price again. Subsequently, it was believed to have been locked in a bank vault while du Pont was imprisoned. He died while still incarcerated on 9 December 2010.

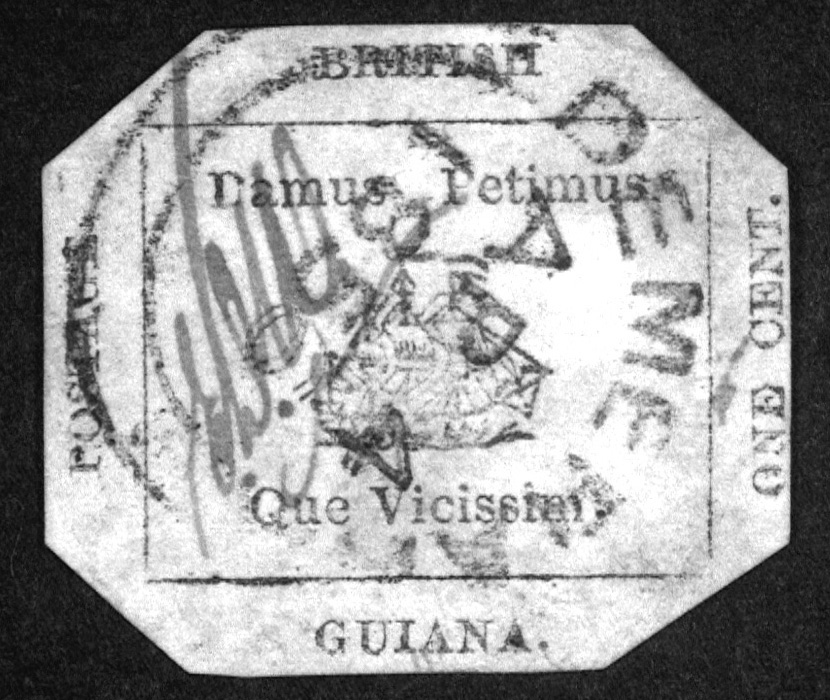
The stamp photographed using an infrared filter, making the printing more visible

Du Pont's estate sold the stamp on 17 June 2014 at a Sotheby's New York auction, sale number N09154, for $9,480,000, including buyer's premium. It took only two minutes to sell to an anonymous bidder and was the fourth time the stamp had broken the world record for a single-stamp bid; this time, the sale broke the 1996 record of $2,300,000 for the Treskilling Yellow, an 1855 Swedish stamp. The purchaser has since identified himself as shoe designer and businessman Stuart Weitzman, who collected stamps as a child. 80 percent of the proceeds from the auction went to Bulgarian Valentin Yordanov, a retired Bulgarian wrestler, to whom Du Pont left the majority of his estate.

The stamp was put up for auction again at Sotheby's in New York on 8 June 2021, where it sold for $8,307,000, falling short of the pre-sale estimate and the previous sale price. It was purchased by rare stamp dealership Stanley Gibbons, who placed it on display at their London shop in a specially-constructed zero-oxygen frame. Beginning November 8, 2021, individuals are able to purchase fractional ownership of the stamp from on line marketplace Showpiece. After his company purchased the stamp, Stanley Gibbons CEO Graham Shircore said "we're delighted to be welcoming it back on to British soil where we hope it will remain."

The fractional model has no secondary trading market, making the pieces highly illiquid. While plans to establish a peer-to-peer marketplace allowing collectors to buy and sell pieces from one another were initially proposed, this was never launched. Consequently, existing shares remain non-tradable on the open market.

== Owners and personal marks ==
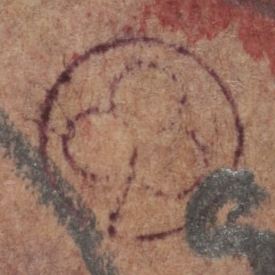
Ferrary's trefoil on the rear side

Since 1856, several of the stamp's owners have placed a personal mark on the rear, or verso, side of the stamp. In its 2021 auction catalogue note for the stamp, Sotheby's described "the eight marks of its keepers for the past one hundred and forty-three years," including the "purple trefoil stamp of Philipp La Rénotière von Ferrary" and the "comet handstamp of Frederick Small." Finbar Kenny, who brokered the purchase of the stamp for Small, also left his initials. At least seven different individuals have left a mark on the reverse of the stamp.

It was said that infrared photos taken at the Smithsonian National Postal Museum in 2014 "revealed a four-leaf clover beneath the seventeen-point star" design on the stamps' reverse; the star was said to have been applied by Ann Hind to "obscure her husband's mark," a cloverleaf design that bears his initials, "AH." Sotheby's likewise described this in 2014 as "perhaps a seventeen-point star handstamp on reverse used to obscure the cloverleaf of [Hind's] husband," but in their 2021 listing, the auction house simply described it as part of Arthur Hind's mark. As part of their 2021 listing, Sotheby's also included an image of an 1851 postal cover bearing the same star design stamp, the only other example known, referring to it as the "'Hind' seventeen point star." In their exhibition of the stamp, Stanley Gibbons listed the seventeen point handstamp as part of Arthur Hind's mark.

Most recently, Stuart Weitzman added his initials and a line drawing of a stiletto shoe in pencil, causing some controversy in philatelic circles. See below for a list of the stamp's owners, their nationalities, and the marks they left, if any, on the stamp's reverse:

List of owners and personal marks since 1856
Name	Year(s) owned	Personal mark	Nationality	Notes
Andrew Hunter	1856–1873	None	United Kingdom	Original recipient of the stamp by mail
Louis Vernon Vaughan	1873	None	United Kingdom	Hunter's nephew who, aged 12, found the stamp among his uncle's personal letters in Georgetown, Guiana
Neil Ross McKinnon	1873–1878	None	United Kingdom	A local collector, he at first declined to buy it, feeling it was a bad specimen; while he owned the stamp, British Guiana started to garner attention from the philatelic world
Thomas Ridpath	1878	None	United Kingdom	Liverpool dealer. He recognised its rarity and bought it "on the spot" for £120. Just days later, he sold it to Ferrary in Paris, perhaps for about £150
Philipp von Ferrary	1878–1917/20 (Note: Ferrary died in 1917 and, as he was an Austrian citizen and therefore "technically an enemy of France," his stamp collection "was seized as enemy property under provisions of the Treaty of Versailles that came into effect in January 1920")	Purple trefoil within a circle	(Austria-Hungary) Austria/ France (Note: As explained by Delcampe Philately magazine in 2017 and the Museum of Philately, Ferrary was born an Italian in France, and took French nationality in 1871. After his father died in 1876, he was adopted by Emmanuel de La Renotière von Kriegsfeld, an Austrian count, and took Austrian nationality; he adopted the right of residence in Braunau in 1885, an act equivalent to taking Austrian nationality. In 1908, he took Swiss citizenship but remained an Austrian national. France seized his collection as war reparations and auctioned it after he died)	The famous collector, who kept the stamp for several decades; during this time, it became known as the "Rarest Stamp in the World"
French government	1920–1922	None	France	Ferrary died in 1917. France seized his stamp collection and auctioned it in Paris between 1921 and 1926; at this time, the wider world finally saw an image of the famed 1c magenta
Arthur Hind	1922–1932	Clover leaf bearing his initials, "AH"; it is within a seventeen-point star	United States/ United Kingdom	Paid over $32,500 in 1922 at the Ferrary sale, making world headlines; he showed the stamp at various exhibitions
Ann Hind Scala	1932–1940	Perhaps applied the seventeen-point star handstamp to "obscure her husband's mark"	United States	Arthur Hind's estranged wife, she displayed the stamp at the 1939–40 New York World's Fair; sold it to Small for $45,000
Frederick Trouton Small	1940–1970	A comet handstamp; his agent, Finbar Kenny, also initialled "FK" in pencil	Australia	Finbar Kenny, manager of the Macy's stamp department, brokered the purchase
Irwin Weinberg and Associates	1970–1980	"IW" in pencil	United States	Purchased for $280,000; Weinberg carried the stamp "in a briefcase handcuffed to his wrist, with an ever-present armed guard."
John Eleuthère du Pont	1980–2010/14 (Note: Du Pont died in 2010, and his estate sold the stamp in 2014)	"JEdP" in pencil	United States	Heir to the DuPont fortune, murdered wrestler Dave Schultz and died in prison
Stuart Weitzman	2014–2021	A stiletto and the initials "SW," both in pencil	United States	American shoe designer, paid $9,480,000 at Sotheby's New York on June 17, 2014
Stanley Gibbons PLC	8 Jun 2021-- 8 Nov 2021	None	United Kingdom	London stamp dealing company since 1856, with a royal warrant; purchased at Sotheby's in New York on June 8, 2021, for $8,307,000 (including premium)
Fractional Ownership	8 Nov 2021	None	–	80,000 shares of fractional ownership initially valued at £100, via online marketplace Showpiece

== Rumours and fakes ==
At one point, it was suggested that the 1c stamp was merely a "doctored" copy of the magenta 4c stamp of the same series, a stamp very similar to the 1c stamp in appearance. These claims were disproven.

In the 1920s a rumour developed that a second copy of the stamp had been discovered by then-owner, Arthur Hind, who quietly purchased the supposed second copy to subsequently destroy it. The rumour has not been substantiated.

In 1999, a second 1c stamp was claimed to have been discovered in Bremen, Germany. The stamp was owned by Peter Winter, who is widely known for producing many forgeries of classic philatelic items, printed as facsimiles on modern paper. The stamp was twice examined and found to be a fake by the Royal Philatelic Society London. In their opinion, this specimen is an altered 4c magenta stamp.

== Public display ==
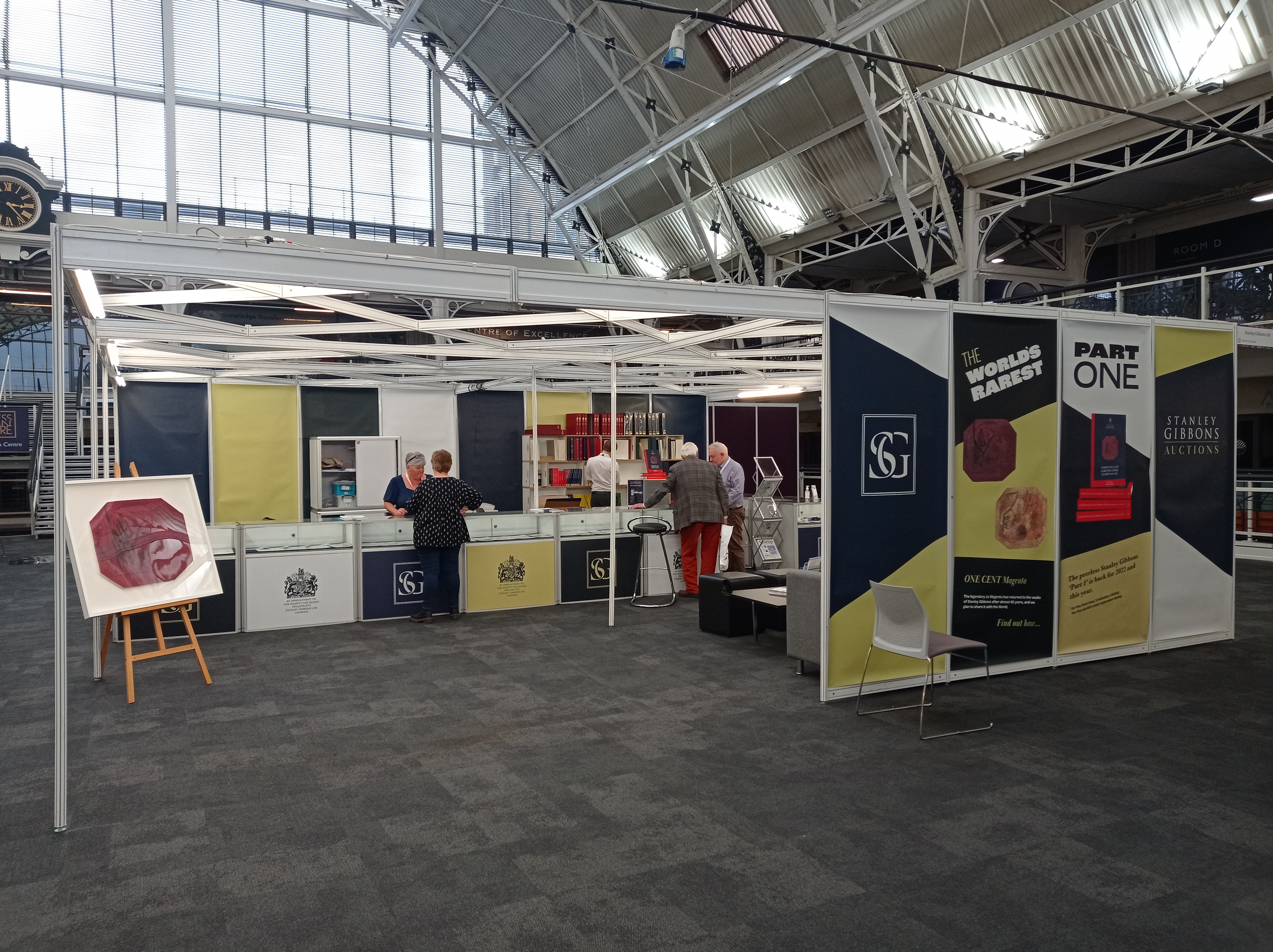
Stanley Gibbons promoting their ownership of the stamp at their stand at Autumn Stampex 2021

The stamp was displayed at the 1939 New York World's Fair, the 1956 Fifth International Philatelic Exhibition (FIPEX) in the New York Coliseum, in Australia in 1963, at New York's 1964 Centenary International Stamp exhibition (CIPEX), in London in 1965 and at Toronto's Canadian Philatelic Exhibition (CAPEX) in 1978.

In November 2014, the National Postal Museum of the Smithsonian Institution announced that the then-anonymous owner of the stamp had agreed to display it at the museum in Washington, D.C., beginning 4 June 2015 and running through 2 December 2018. Next to the Postal Museum exhibit is a copy of a Donald Duck comic book, The Gilded Man, (OS 422) from 1952 whose central plot element revolves around Donald and his nephews, Huey, Louie and Dewey, going to British Guiana to try to find another copy of the stamp. The comic is written and drawn by Carl Barks.

The stamp was exhibited in the Court of Honor at World Stamp Show-NY 2016 in New York City from 28 May to 3 June 2016.

Shortly after the 2021 sale, the British stamp dealing and philatelic publishing firm of Stanley Gibbons announced themselves as the buyers of the stamp. Beginning November 8, 2021, individuals are able to purchase fractional ownership of the stamp from Stanley Gibbons. From the same month to December, the stamp is exhibited by Stanley Gibbons at their headquarters at 399 Strand, London. It recently appeared in September 2023 at the London Stampex exhibition, and during November—December 2023 in Bangkok.

== In popular culture ==
- In The Adventure of the Penny Magenta, the private detective Solar Pons solves in one of his cases the theft of the One-Cent Magenta. This short story is part of the collection The Return of Solar Pons by August Derleth, published in 1958. Called "one-penny magenta" there, all the details (year of print, real-life owners mentioned, octagonal form, colour) give away that it is the One-Cent Magenta.

== See also ==
- List of postage stamps
- List of most expensive philatelic items
- Finbar Kenny, manager of Macy's stamp department, who arranged the sale of the stamp in 1940
- Robert A. Siegel, who auctioned the stamp twice, in 1970 and 1980
- Treskilling Yellow
