= Nemouria =

- Discipline: Biology
- Language: English

Publication details
- History: 1970–present
- Publisher: Delaware Museum of Natural History
- Frequency: Irregular

Standard abbreviations
- ISO 4: Nemouria

Indexing
- ISSN: 0085-3887

Links
- Journal homepage

Nemouria: Occasional Papers of the Delaware Museum of Natural History is a peer-reviewed scientific journal covering natural history that is published by the Delaware Museum of Natural History. It was established in 1970.

The journal mainly focuses on molluscs and birds, but occasionally publishes papers on other topics, relating to North America or a region well represented in the museum's collection, such as the Indo-West Pacific or Philippines.
