= Pierre Mahé =

French philatelist

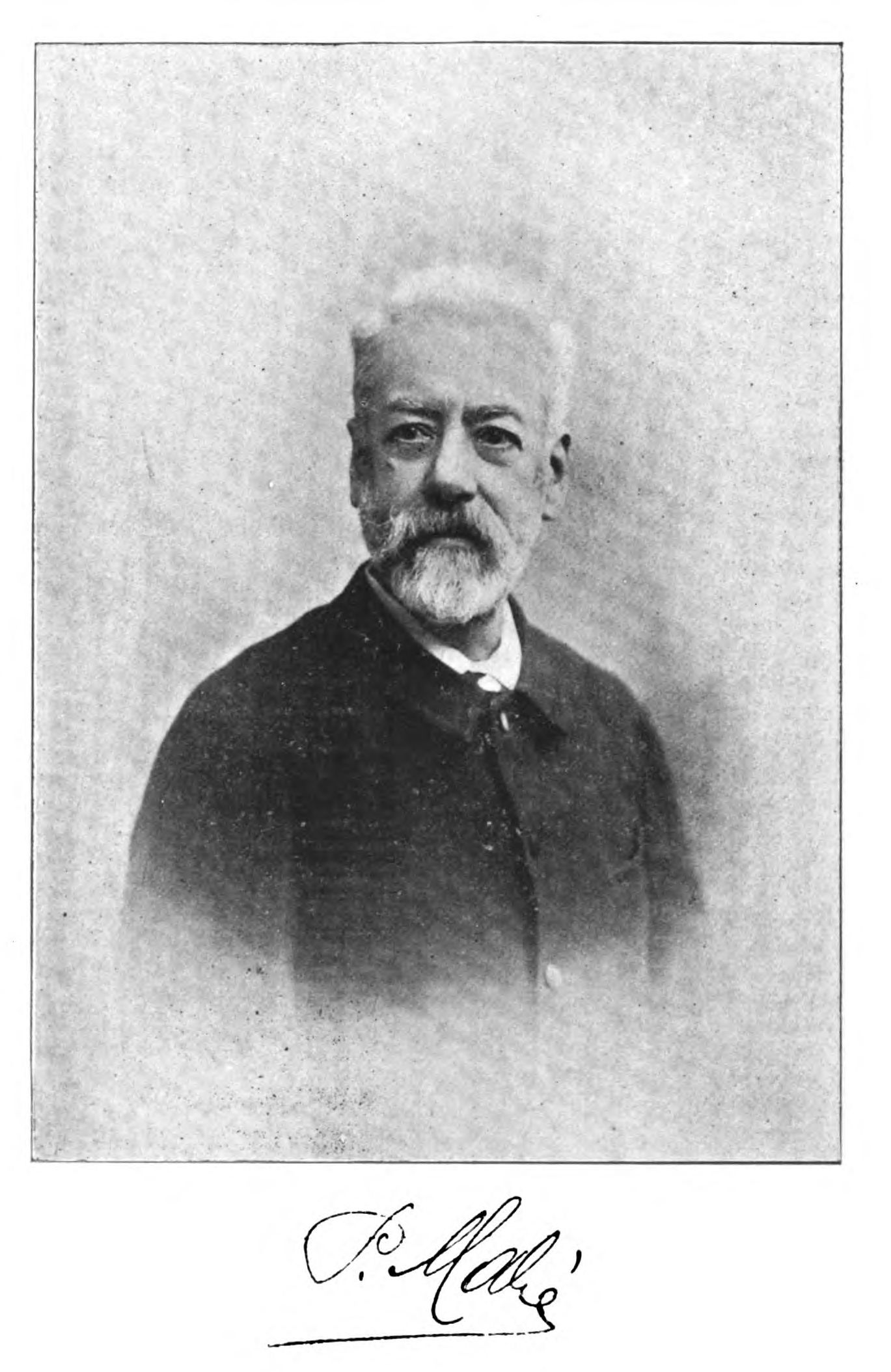
Pierre Mahé, French stamp dealer and private secretary and supervisor of the stamp collection of Philipp von Ferrary, photograph of around 1890

Pierre Marie Mahé (1833 – 2 February 1913) was a French stamp dealer who was acknowledged as one of the Fathers of Philately on the Roll of Distinguished Philatelists.

== Association with Philipp von Ferrary ==
By profession, Mahé was an officer of the Academy of Paris. Mahé owned a succession of stamp shops in Paris at Rue de Clichy, Rue de Chateaudon and Rue de Cannettes. One of his customers was Philipp von Ferrary who later employed Mahé as his private secretary and custodian of his stamp collection at his mansion in Rue de Varennes from 1874 until Mahé died in 1913.

After Pierre's death, his son Édouard M. Mahé took over the work. Pierre was also survived by a daughter.

== Awards ==
In 1907 at the Congres des Societes Savantes, Mahé was named an Officer de l'Instruction Publique.

In 1910 he received the Lindenberg Medal.

== Selected publications ==
- Les Marchands de Timbres-Poste d'autrefois et leurs catalogues. Amiens, France: Yvert et Tellier, 1908.
