= John du Pont =

American murderer (1938–2010)

John Eleuthère du Pont
- du Pont in February 1992
- Born: November 22, 1938; Philadelphia, Pennsylvania, U.S.
- Died: December 9, 2010 (aged 72); State Correctional Institution – Laurel Highlands, Somerset Township, Pennsylvania, U.S.
- Status: Deceased
- Conviction: Third-degree murder
- Penalty: 13 to 30 years in prison

Details
- Victims: David Lesley Schultz, aged 36
- Date: January 26, 1996
- Locations: Newtown Square, Pennsylvania, U.S.
- Spouse(s): Gale Wenk (m. 1983; annulled after 90 days; div. 1987)
- Parents: William du Pont Jr. (father); Jean Liseter Austin (mother)

John Eleuthère du Pont (November 22, 1938 – December 9, 2010) was an American philanthropist and convicted murderer. An heir to the du Pont family fortune, he was a published ornithologist, philatelist, conchologist, and sports enthusiast.

In 1972, du Pont founded and directed the Delaware Museum of Natural History and contributed to Villanova University and other institutions. In the 1980s, he established a wrestling facility at his Foxcatcher Farm estate after becoming interested in the sport and in pentathlon events. Du Pont became a prominent supporter of amateur sports in the United States and a sponsor of USA Wrestling.

By the 1990s, friends and acquaintances were concerned about du Pont's erratic and paranoid behavior, but his wealth shielded him. On February 25, 1997, he was convicted of murder in the third degree for the January 26, 1996, shooting of Dave Schultz, an Olympic champion freestyle wrestler living and working on du Pont's estate that was located in Newtown Square, Pennsylvania. He was ruled to have been mentally ill but not insane and was sentenced to prison for thirteen to thirty years. Du Pont died in prison at age 72 on December 9, 2010. To date, he and Robert Durst are the only members of the Forbes 400 richest Americans to be convicted of murder.

== Early life and education ==
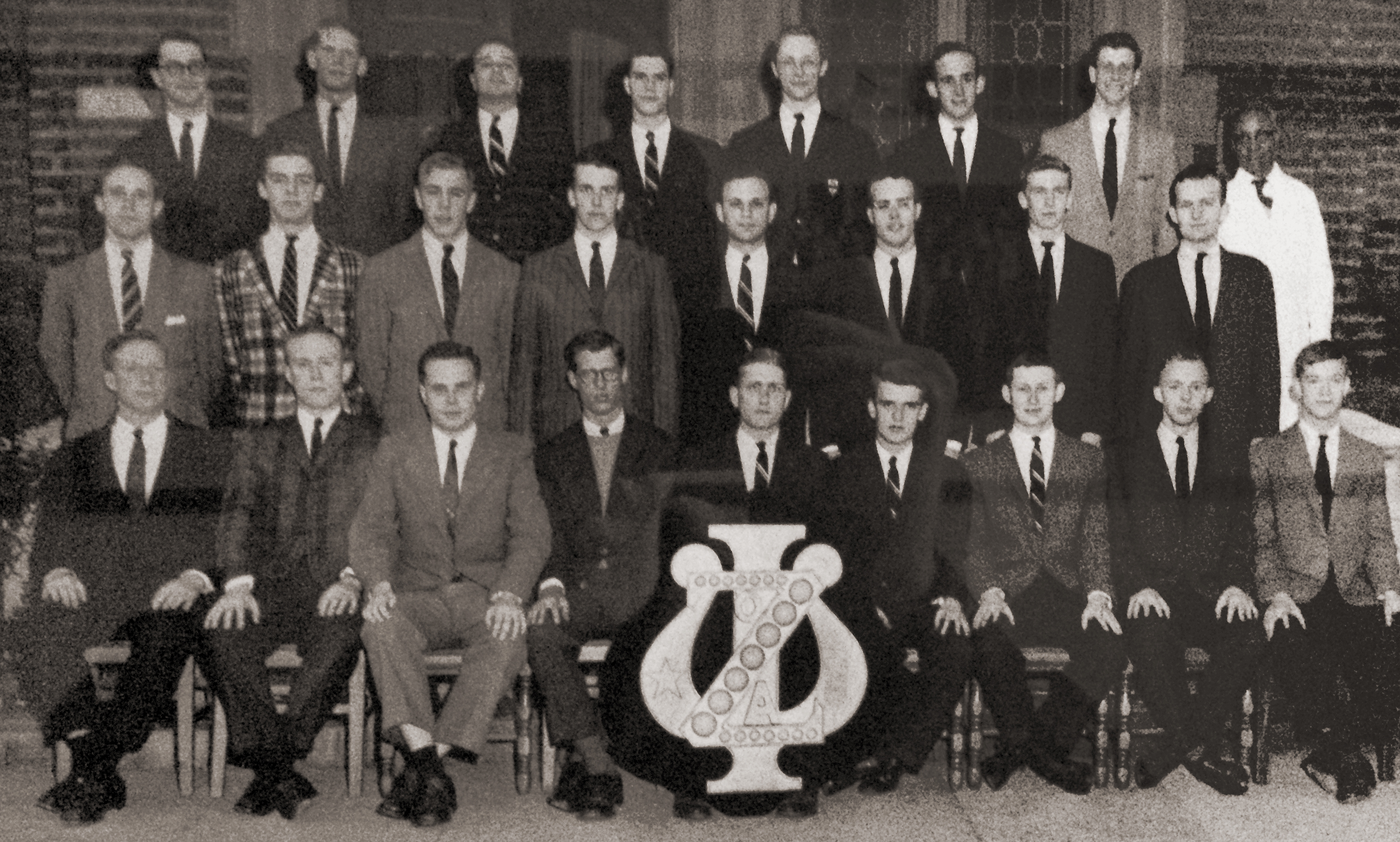
du Pont (front left) as a member of Zeta Psi fraternity at the University of Pennsylvania

John du Pont was born on November 22, 1938, in Philadelphia, Pennsylvania, the youngest of four children of William du Pont, Jr. and Jean Liseter Austin (1897–1988). He grew up at Liseter Hall, a mansion built in 1922 in Newtown Square, Pennsylvania, by his maternal grandfather on more than 80 hectares (200 acres) of land given to his parents at their wedding by his maternal grandfather. Both his parents' families had emigrated from Europe to the United States at the beginning of the 19th century and became highly successful.

During the 1920s and 1930s, du Pont's parents acquired more land and developed Liseter Hall Farm for Thoroughbred breeding, showing, and racing. His mother retained Liseter Hall Farm after the couple divorced in 1941. She added a dairy herd of Guernseys and bred Welsh ponies at the farm. John was aged 2 when his parents divorced. He had two older sisters, Jean and Evelyn; an older brother, Henry E. I. du Pont; and a younger half brother, William du Pont III, born of their father's second marriage.

Du Pont graduated from Haverford School in 1957. He attended the University of Pennsylvania, where he belonged to the Zeta Psi fraternity, but withdrew before completing his freshman year. He later attended college in Miami, Florida, where he studied under and was mentored by scientist Oscar T. Owre. He graduated from the University of Miami in 1965 with a Bachelor of Science degree in zoology. He earned an honorary doctorate in natural science from Villanova University in 1971. Some sources incorrectly stated that he earned a "Ph.D" from Villanova in 1973, but Villanova did not have a doctoral program in biology at that time.

== Science career ==
During his graduate work, du Pont participated in several scientific expeditions to study and identify species of birds in the Philippines and South Pacific. As an ornithologist, du Pont is credited with the discovery of two dozen species of birds. He founded the Delaware Museum of Natural History in 1957. As a young man, he served on the board, helping guide the institution toward opening in 1972. After having been part of scientific expeditions, he served as director of the museum for many years.

== Personal life ==
At the age of 45, on September 3, 1983, du Pont married 29-year-old Gale Wenk, an occupational therapist. They met after he injured his hand in an auto accident. They lived together for less than six months. Du Pont filed for divorce when they had been married for ten months. Wenk sued du Pont for $5 million, claiming he had pointed a gun at her and tried to push her into a fireplace. The divorce became final in 1987. Du Pont's will excluded her from inheriting any of his estate. In 1987, it was estimated that John du Pont was worth $200 million.

== Interests ==
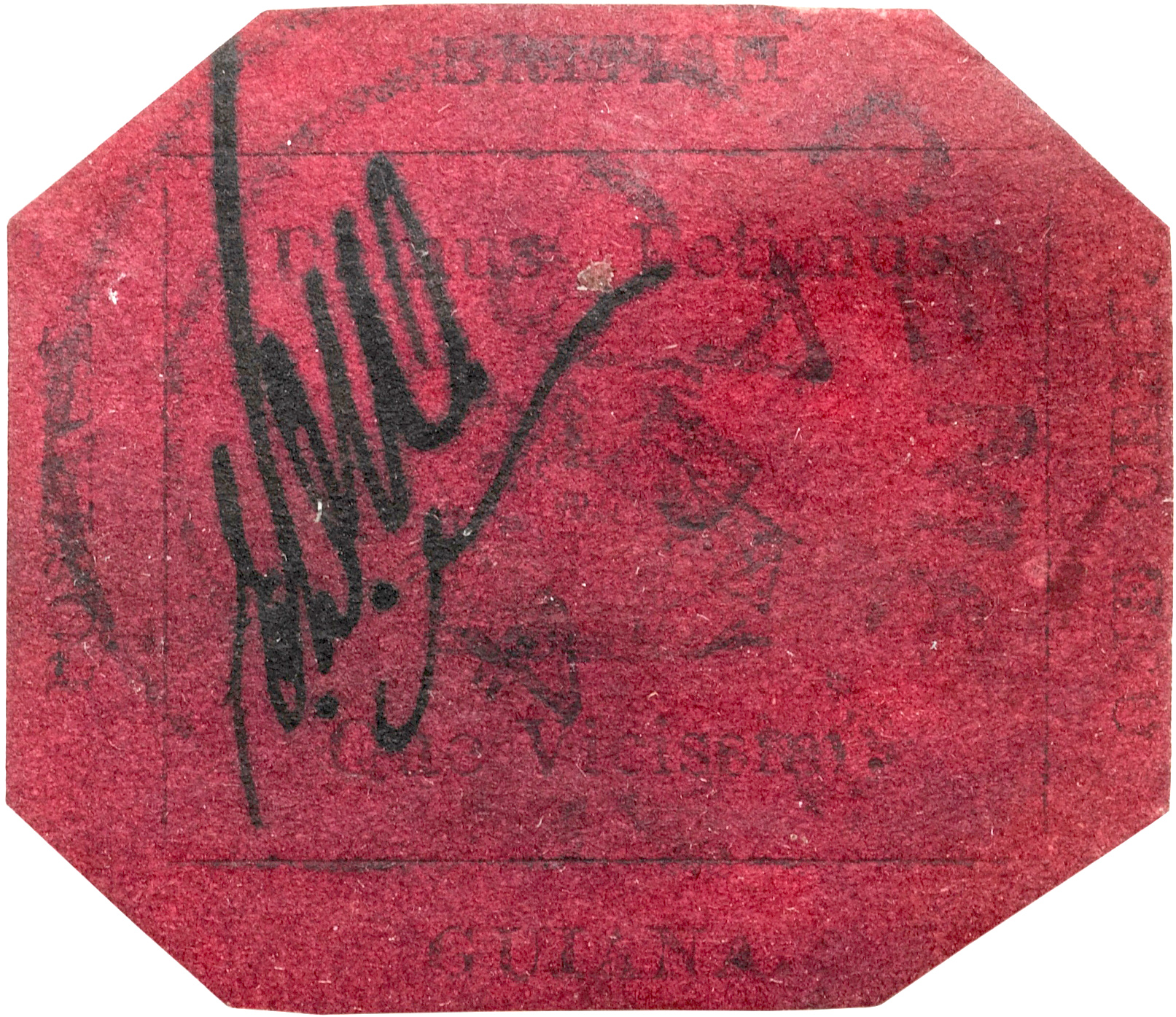
The British Guiana 1c magenta postage stamp

=== Philately ===
Du Pont was also a philatelist. Bidding anonymously in a 1980 auction, he paid $935,000 for one of the rarest stamps in the world, the British Guiana 1856 1c black on magenta. After his death, this stamp was sold at auction for $9.5 million (inclusive of buyer's premium) at Sotheby's June 17, 2014. For the fourth time, the stamp broke the record for a single stamp's sale.

The unique stamp was part of the estate of du Pont. According to du Pont's will—unsuccessfully challenged by several parties—80 percent of the sale proceeds went to the family of Bulgarian wrestler Valentin Jordanov Dimitrov and 20 percent to the Eurasian Pacific Wildlife Foundation, based in Paoli, Pennsylvania, a group du Pont founded to support Pacific wildlife. In 1986, competing as "John Foxbridge", he won the Grand Prix d'Honneur in the FIP Championship Class at the STOCKHOLMIA 86 international stamp exhibition for his display of "British North America". While du Pont continued to buy stamps while in prison, he was not allowed to bring them there.

=== Athletics ===
Du Pont developed the 440-acre (180 ha) Liseter Hall Farm in Newtown Square as a high-quality wrestling facility for amateur wrestlers. He called the private group "Team Foxcatcher", after his father's noted racing stable. Du Pont established an Olympic swimming and wrestling training center and sponsored competitive events at the estate. He also allowed some people, such as Olympic champion wrestlers Mark Schultz and Dave Schultz and his wife, to live in houses on the grounds for years. Dave Schultz also coached the Foxcatcher team, of which Kurt Angle, who won a gold medal at the 1996 Summer Olympics six months after Schultz's murder, was a member.

Du Pont became a sponsor in wrestling, swimming, track, and the modern pentathlon. He was also involved in promoting a subset of the modern pentathlon (run, swim, shoot) as a separate event. He took up athletics and became a competitive wrestler in his 50s. His only prior wrestling experience was as a freshman in high school. He began competing again at the age of 55 in the 1992 Veteran's World Championships in Cali, Colombia; following that in 1993 in Toronto, Ontario; and in 1995 in Sofia, Bulgaria.

== Lawsuit ==
In August 1988, a problem-plagued wrestling program he funded at Villanova was shut down after just two years. In December 1988, a lawsuit, which was settled out of court, claimed du Pont had made improper sexual advances to Villanova assistant coach Andre Metzger.

== Murder of Dave Schultz ==
On January 26, 1996, du Pont shot and killed Dave Schultz in the driveway of Schultz's home on du Pont's 800-acre (320 ha) estate that was located in Newtown Square, Pennsylvania. The building has since been demolished. Schultz's wife Nancy and du Pont's head of security Patrick Goodale, who was a former U.S. Marine officer, were present and witnessed the shooting. The security chief was sitting in the passenger seat of du Pont's car when du Pont fired three bullets into Schultz. Police did not establish a motive. Schultz had worked with du Pont to coach the wrestling team for years.

Du Pont's friends said the shooting was uncharacteristic. Joy Hansen Leutner, a triathlete from Hermosa Beach, California, lived for two years on the estate. Leutner said du Pont helped her through a stressful period in the mid-1980s. She later said, "With my family and friends, John gave me a new lease on life. He gave more than money; he gave himself emotionally." She expressed incredulity about the killing. She is quoted as saying, "There's no way John in his right mind would have killed Dave." Newtown Township supervisor John S. Custer Jr. said, "At the time of the murder, John didn't know what he was doing."

Many people had noticed du Pont's increasingly disruptive behavior in the months before the murder. Charles King Sr. blames du Pont's "security consultant", Patrick Goodale, for influencing what happened. King said, "I don't think John could shoot someone unless he was pushed to, or was on drugs. After that guy started hanging around him, my son always said Johnny changed. He was scared of everything. He was always a little off. But I never had problems with him, and my son never had problems."

After the shooting, du Pont locked himself in his mansion for two days while he negotiated with police on the telephone. Police turned off the home's power and were able to capture him when he went outside to fix his heater. In September 1996, du Pont was ruled incompetent to stand trial, as experts testified that he was psychotic and could not participate in his own defense. He was committed to a mental hospital and his condition was to be reviewed by the court in three months.

During the trial, one of the defense's expert psychiatric witnesses described du Pont as a paranoid schizophrenic who believed Schultz was part of an international conspiracy to kill him. He said du Pont believed people would break into his house and kill him, and that he had installed a variety of security features in his house.

Du Pont pleaded not guilty by reason of insanity. The insanity defense was thrown out by the court and, on February 25, 1997, a jury found him guilty of third-degree murder but mentally ill. In Pennsylvania, third-degree murder is a lesser charge than first-degree (intentional) or second-degree (a killing occurring during the perpetration of a felony), and indicates a lack of intent to kill. In Pennsylvania criminal code, "insanity" applies to someone whose "disease or defect" leaves him unable either to understand that his conduct is wrong or to conform it to the law (the M'Naghten Rule).

The jury verdict of "guilty but mentally ill" meant sentencing would be referred to the judge, Patricia Jenkins. She could have sentenced du Pont to 5 to 40 years. He was sentenced to 13 to 30 years' incarceration and was housed at the State Correctional Institution – Mercer, a minimum-security institution in the Pennsylvania prison system. Du Pont was initially confined to Cresson Correctional Institute.

Following the guilty verdict, Nancy Schultz, Dave's widow, filed a wrongful death lawsuit against du Pont. The amount of the settlement was not disclosed. The Philadelphia Inquirer, citing anonymous sources, reported du Pont was to pay Schultz at least $35 million.

Du Pont's attorneys filed appeals in the criminal case. In 2000, his case reached the U.S. Supreme Court, which upheld the verdict. Du Pont was first eligible for parole on January 29, 2009; it was denied. In 2010, the United States Court of Appeal for the Third Circuit in Philadelphia rejected all but one issue raised on appeal (involving his use of prescribed scopolamine before he killed Schultz), and requested written briefs. Du Pont's maximum sentence would have ended on January 29, 2026, when he would have been 87.

== Death ==
Du Pont died at the age of 72 on December 9, 2010, from chronic obstructive pulmonary disease (COPD). A spokesperson for the Pennsylvania Department of Corrections said du Pont was found unresponsive in his bed at the State Correctional Institution – Laurel Highlands. He was pronounced dead at 6:55 a.m. at UPMC Somerset. He was buried in his red Foxcatcher wrestling singlet, in accordance with his will, at the Du Pont de Nemours Cemetery in Wilmington, Delaware.

== Philanthropy and institutions ==
Du Pont founded the Delaware Museum of Natural History in 1957, which opened to the public in 1972 on a site near Winterthur donated by his relative Henry Francis du Pont. John du Pont served on the board for many years. He also helped fund a new basketball arena at Villanova University, which opened in 1986. Originally, it was called the John Eleuthère du Pont Pavilion, but after his conviction, his name was removed from the facility and simply called The Pavilion. Today, the facility is named The Finneran Pavilion.

=== Foxcatcher Farm ===
After his mother's death in 1988, du Pont assumed stewardship of Liseter Hall Farm and renamed it "Foxcatcher Farm" after his father's famed Thoroughbred racing stable. At the time, he was not living in the manor house; he occupied a smaller house on the estate. Days after his mother's death, he moved into the main house. He maintained much of her work, but added a wrestling facility and supporting buildings for that interest.

After his arrest, du Pont sold off the dairy herd, nearly 70 Guernseys, in the fall of 1996. He ordered all the buildings at Foxcatcher Farm to be painted a matte black. The Delaware Museum of Natural History, which du Pont formerly headed and which held the dairy farm in trust, sold that portion in January 1998 after his conviction and sentencing to prison. A 123-acre (50 ha) segment is now occupied by the campus of the Episcopal Academy, a private independent K–12 school founded in 1785, which moved there in 2008 from split campuses located in the nearby Philadelphia Main Line communities of Merion and Devon.

The 90-year-old du Pont mansion, Liseter Hall, in which du Pont was raised and on which property he had lived for 57 years, was demolished by Glenn Miller Demolition in January 2013. The mansion stood on a 400-acre (160 ha) portion of the property that is now being developed by Toll Brothers into a "master planned community of 449 luxury homes" called "Liseter Estate." Most of the outbuildings were torn down, though an existing 7,000 sq ft (650 m^{2}) historical barn will be used as a clubhouse in the new development.

== Disputed will ==
Du Pont had been worth an estimated $200 million in 1986, about $590 million in current dollars. His will bequeathed 80 percent of his estate to Bulgarian wrestler Valentin Yordanov, an Olympic champion who had trained at Foxcatcher, and Yordanov's relatives. In June 2011, du Pont's niece Beverly A. du Pont Gauggel and nephew William H. du Pont filed a petition to challenge the will in Media, Pennsylvania, asserting that du Pont was not "of sound mind" when he made his will. The petition claims that during that period, John du Pont asserted alternately that he was Jesus Christ, the Dalai Lama, and a Russian tsar.

That petition was dismissed, and while appealed, the Superior Court of Pennsylvania upheld a Delaware County Orphans Court order dismissing a challenge to the will. Former Delaware County Court of Common Pleas President Judge Joseph Cronin dismissed the challenge for lack of standing, finding that because the niece and nephew were not named in two successive wills going back to 2006, they would not be harmed if the September 2010 will were deemed valid. A three-judge panel of the Superior Court affirmed that ruling on November 19, 2012.

== Representation in media ==
- Du Pont's murder of Dave Schultz is recounted in the 2013 true crime book Wrestling with Madness.
- The 2014 film Foxcatcher, directed by Bennett Miller, was based on the events related to the Schultz brothers and exploring John du Pont's relationship with them. For his portrayal of du Pont, Steve Carell was nominated for the Academy Award for Best Actor.
- Olympic wrestling champion Mark Schultz, the younger brother of Dave Schultz, wrote Foxcatcher: The True Story of My Brother's Murder, John du Pont's Madness, and the Quest for Olympic Gold.
- ESPN Films featured the story of du Pont and Team Foxcatcher in the 2015 30 for 30 series film The Prince of Pennsylvania. The film features several former members of the Foxcatcher wrestling team, including Mark Schultz, as well as John du Pont's ex-wife Gale Denny and Mark and Dave Schultz's parents. The film, which was directed by Jesse Vile, premiered on October 20, 2015, and takes its title from a letter Dave Schultz wrote to Prince Albert of Monaco rejecting his proposal for Schultz to become the coach of a wrestling team in Monaco.
- Netflix produced the 2016 film documentary entitled Team Foxcatcher which tells the story of John du Pont's involvement with wrestling and Foxcatcher Farm using interviews with many of those present as well as archival footage.

== Bibliography ==
=== Books ===
- Living Volutes: a Monograph of the Recent Volutidae of the World (1970) OCLC 104615
- Philippine Birds (1971) ISBN 9780913176030
- South Pacific Birds (1976) ISBN 0-913176-04-4

=== Papers ===
- Amadon, Dean; Dupont, John E (1970). "Notes on Philippine birds". Nemouria. 1: 1–14.
- Dupont, John E (1971). "Notes on Philippine Birds (No. 1)". Nemouria. 3: 1–6.
- Dupont, John E (1972). "Notes on Philippine Birds (No. 2). Birds of Ticao". Nemouria. 6: 1–13.
- Dupont, John E (1972). "Notes on Philippine Birds (No. 3). Birds of Marinduque". Nemouria. 7: 1–14.
- Dupont, John E (1976). "Notes on Philippine Birds (No. 4). Additions and Corrections To Philippine Birds". Nemouria. 17: 1–13.
- Dupont, John E (1980). "Notes on Philippine birds (No. 5). Birds of Burias". Nemouria. 24: 1–6.
- Dupont, John E; Rabor, D S (1973). "South Sulu Archipelago Birds. An Expedition Report". Nemouria. 9. Delaware Museum of Natural History: 1–63. ISSN 0085-3887.
- Dupont, John E; Rabor, D S (1973). "Birds of Dinagat and Siargao, Philippines". Nemouria. 10. Delaware Museum of Natural History: 1–111. ISSN 0085-3887.
- Dupont, John E; Niles, David M (1980). "Redescription of Halcyon bougainvillei excelsa Mayr, 1941". Bulletin of the British Ornithologists' Club. 100: 232–233.
