= Inohara =

Inohara may refer to:

- 7673 Inohara, a main-belt asteroid named after Japanese amateur astronomer Masanori Inohara (b. 1921)
- Junzo Inohara (猪原 淳三; 1910–????), Japanese hockey player
- Yoshihiko Inohara (井ノ原 快彦; born 1976), Japanese actor, singer and host
