= World Stamp Show-NY 2016 =

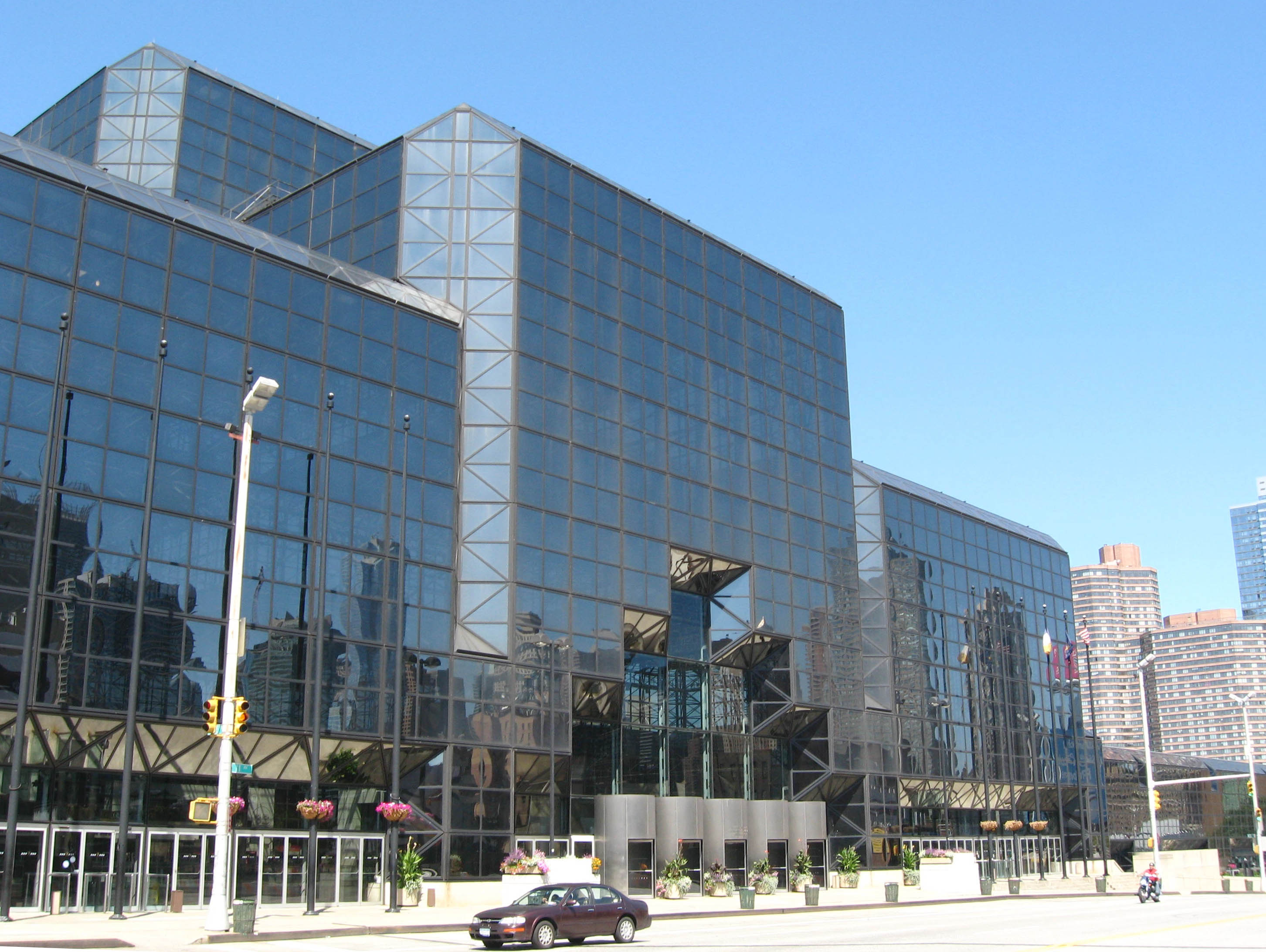
- Venue: Javits Center
- Location: New York City
- Type: Exhibition

World Stamp Show-NY 2016 was an international exhibition of stamp collecting held at the Jacob K. Javits Convention Center in New York City from May 28 to June 4, 2016. It was the first international stamp show to be held in New York since FIPEX in 1956.

The show brought together stamp collectors, dealers, exhibitors, postal administrations and societies from several countries to sell, buy and discuss all aspects of the hobby known as philately. Between 250,000 and 300,000 visitors were expected to attend the show during its eight days.

The show was a continuation of a series of international philatelic exhibitions that have taken place in the United States approximately every 10 years since the beginning of the 20th century, typically in a year ending in 6 or 7.

== Patronage ==
World Stamp Show-NY 2016 was held under the patronage of the Fédération Internationale de Philatélie. It was sponsored by the American Philatelic Society. with assistance by the Collectors Club of New York. The United States Postal Service was a major supporter; in 2015, they issued two new first-class "Forever" stamps to promote the show, and additional stamps and souvenir items were issued during the show.

== Exhibits ==
Around 3,800 competitive exhibit frames displayed stamp presentations in numerous categories created by collectors from over 70 countries. Several famous and rare stamps were shown in the Court of Honor, including the world's most expensive, the unique 1856 British Guiana 1c magenta, which was sold by Sotheby's to an anonymous buyer (later identified as shoe designer and businessman Stuart Weitzman) on June 17, 2014, for a record $9.48 million.

== Palmares ==
The Grand Prix went to the following exhibits:

- Grand Prix d'Honneur: Alvaro Castro-Harrigan (Costa Rica) for "Panama: First Issues as a State of Colombia and Their Forerunners".
- Grand Prix International: Wei Gang (China) for "China: The Postal History of Mongolia 1841–1921".
- Grand Prix National: Gordon Eubanks (United States) for "The United States Imperforate Issues of 1851–1856 & Their Importance in an Expanding Postal System".

The Best in Class awards and/or highest points in each category went to the following exhibits:

- Postal Stationery: John Sinfield (Australia) for "Panama Republic Postal Stationery to 1940" (96 points)
- Aerophilately: Four exhibits tied on 95 points.
- Astrophilately: Walter Hopferwieser (Austria) for "From Rocket Mail to Space Mail" (92 points)
- Thematic Philately: Four exhibits tied on 96 points.
- Revenue: Ralph Ebner (Germany) for "The leave underprint revenues from Austrian Empire and its countries 1854–1875" and Michael Mahler (U.S.A.) for "U.S. Civil War Era Fiscal History Panorama" (97 points)
- Youth: Warrick Wright (New Zealand) for "Revenue Gathering Stamps of New Zealand" (88 points)
- Philatelic Literature: Fred F. Gregory (U.S.A.) for "Hawaii Foreign Mail to 1870" (96 points)
- One Frame Exhibit: Cheryl R. Ganz (U.S.A.) for "The 50c Zeppelin Issue: A Study in Design" (94 points)
- Modern Philately: Deepak Haritwal (U.S.A.) for "Machine Vended Postage Labels of USA (1989–2004)" (87 points)
- Open Philately: John Davies (U.K.) for "A Jubilee Reminiscence. The 1890 Penny Postage Jubilee" (93 points)
- First Day Cover Exhibits: Anthony Dewey (U.S.A.) for "The 3c Connecticut Tercentenary Issue of 1935 and Its First Days" (92 points)

== Controversy ==
The judging of exhibits at the show by judges of the Fédération Internationale de Philatélie has been strongly criticized for arbitrarily downgrading exhibits to lower award levels than they had previously received in international exhibitions.

== Auctions ==
A number of major auctions took place at WSS-NY 2016. Among them were Robert A. Siegel Auction Galleries of New York, Daniel F. Kelleher Auctions, based in Danbury, Connecticut, H.R. Harmer based in Tustin, California and Auktionshaus Christoph Gärtner, based near Stuttgart, Germany.

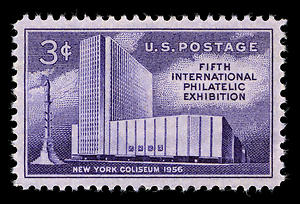
Fifth-international-philatelic-exhibition

== Organization ==
The organizing committee for World Stamp Show-NY 2016 was led by Wade Saadi, a prominent American philatelist and former American Philatelic Society president. Prominent figures from across the American philatelic community comprised its membership.

== See also ==
- List of philatelic exhibitions in the United States
