= Wade E. Saadi =

American philatelist

Wade E. Saadi (May 21, 1949 – October 9, 2025) was an American philatelist who served as president of the American Philatelic Society from 2008 to 2013. Saadi signed the Roll of Distinguished Philatelists in 2010.

In late 2014, the Board of Governors of the Collectors Club of New York City selected Saadi to receive the 2015 Alfred F. Lichtenstein Memorial Award at the Annual Awards Dinner on May 6, 2015, citing Mr. Saadi's contributions to organizational leadership, scholarship, research and writing, and exhibiting.

Saadi was the president of the organizing committee for World Stamp Show-NY 2016, an international philatelic exhibition planned for May 28 – June 4, 2016.

In late 2017, Saadi was awarded Philatelist of the Year, by Delcampe during the MonacoPhil show.
