= John Hutchison (architect) =

Scottish architect

John Hutchison ARIBA (1841–1908) was a 19th-century Scottish architect linked strongly to Paisley.

Over and above his own works he is chiefly remembered as the architect who trained both John Kinross and Charles Rennie Mackintosh.

== Life ==
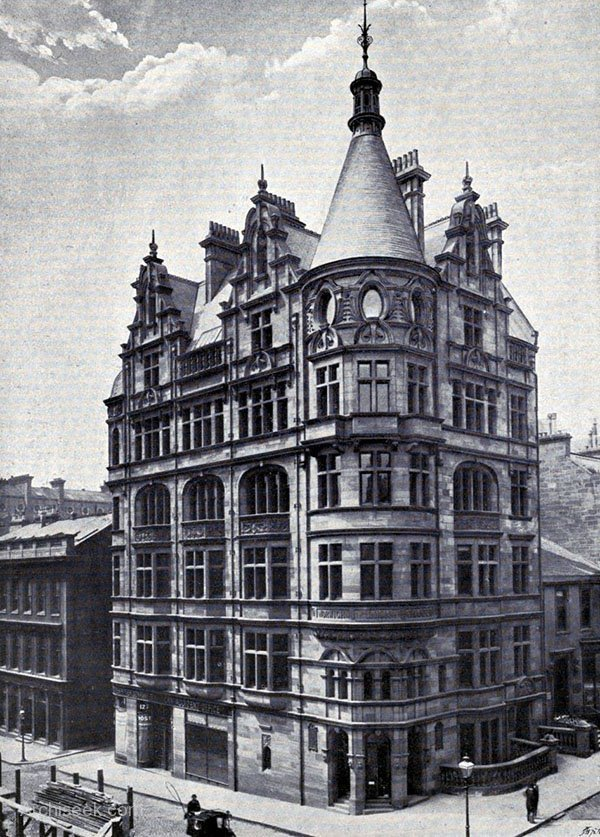
Contemporary postcard of Norwich Union Offices. Hope Street St Vincent Street, Glasgow 1899

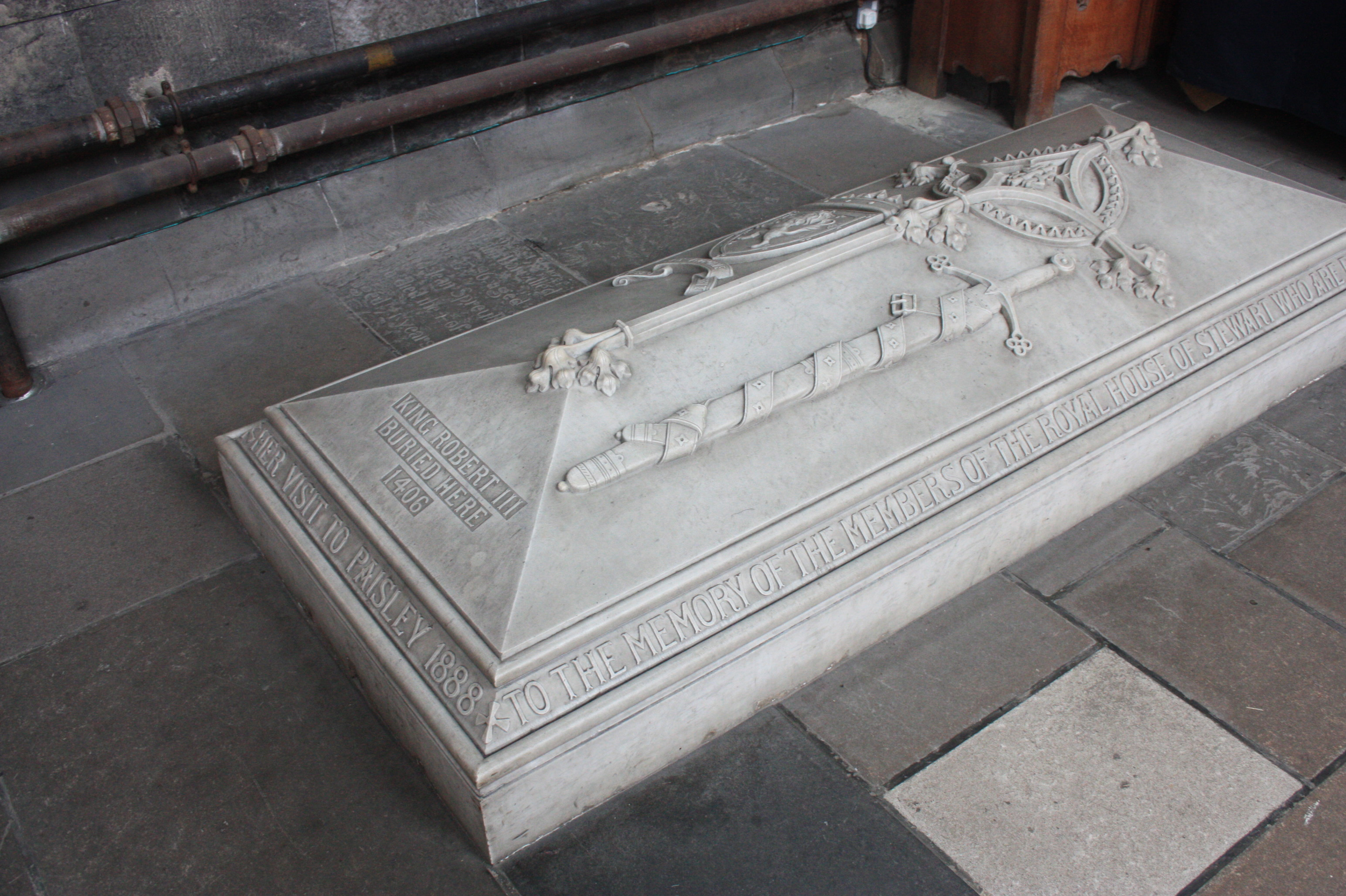
the grave of Robert III by Hutchison

He was born in 1841 at 6 Stow Street in Paisley, the son of Jessie Lachland and her husband, Archibald Hutchison of Forbes, Chirney and Hurchison, shawl-makers with a factory at 5 Forbes Place in Paisley. He was educated in Paisley then Glasgow High School.

He was articled to John Thomas Rochead from around 1855 to 1862.

He set up independently in 1868 at 14 Causeyside in Paisley. In 1870 he shared premises at 62 St Vincent Street with his brother, George Hutchison, a furniture retailer. It was at this point that Charles Rennie Mackintosh joined and some speculate that this mix of architecture and furniture did much to inspire his interests.

In 1888 he was asked to create a design for the restoration of the grave of King Robert III in Paisley Abbey to mark a visit by Queen Victoria.

He died of a cerebral haemorrhage on 24 May 1908 at the family home of Fairhill House in Paisley.

== Notable buildings ==
He worked almost exclusively in Paisley and received many commissions, especially for private villas. Non-residential projects included:

- Burnbank Free Church, Hamilton (1881)
- West Free Church, Hamilton (1882)
- River Street Factory, Glasgow (1885)
- Craigmore UP Church, Rothesay (1889)
- Shortroods School, Paisley (1897)
- Norwich Union Offices, 128 Hope Street/St Vincent Street, Glasgow (1898) his masterpiece
- Abercorn School, Paisley (1900)
- Premises for Loudon Brothers, Cadogan Street/West Campbell Street, Glasgow (1900) demolished late 20th century
- Mission Hall for Sir William Dunn, Paisley (c.1900)
- R. Wylie Hill department store building, Buchanan Street, Glasgow (1889)
- Tenements and shops, Canal Street, Paisley (1903)
- Remodelling of Wylie Hill warehouse, Glasgow (1904)
