= Delaware Museum of Nature & Science =

Natural history museum in Delaware

Delaware Museum of Nature and Science

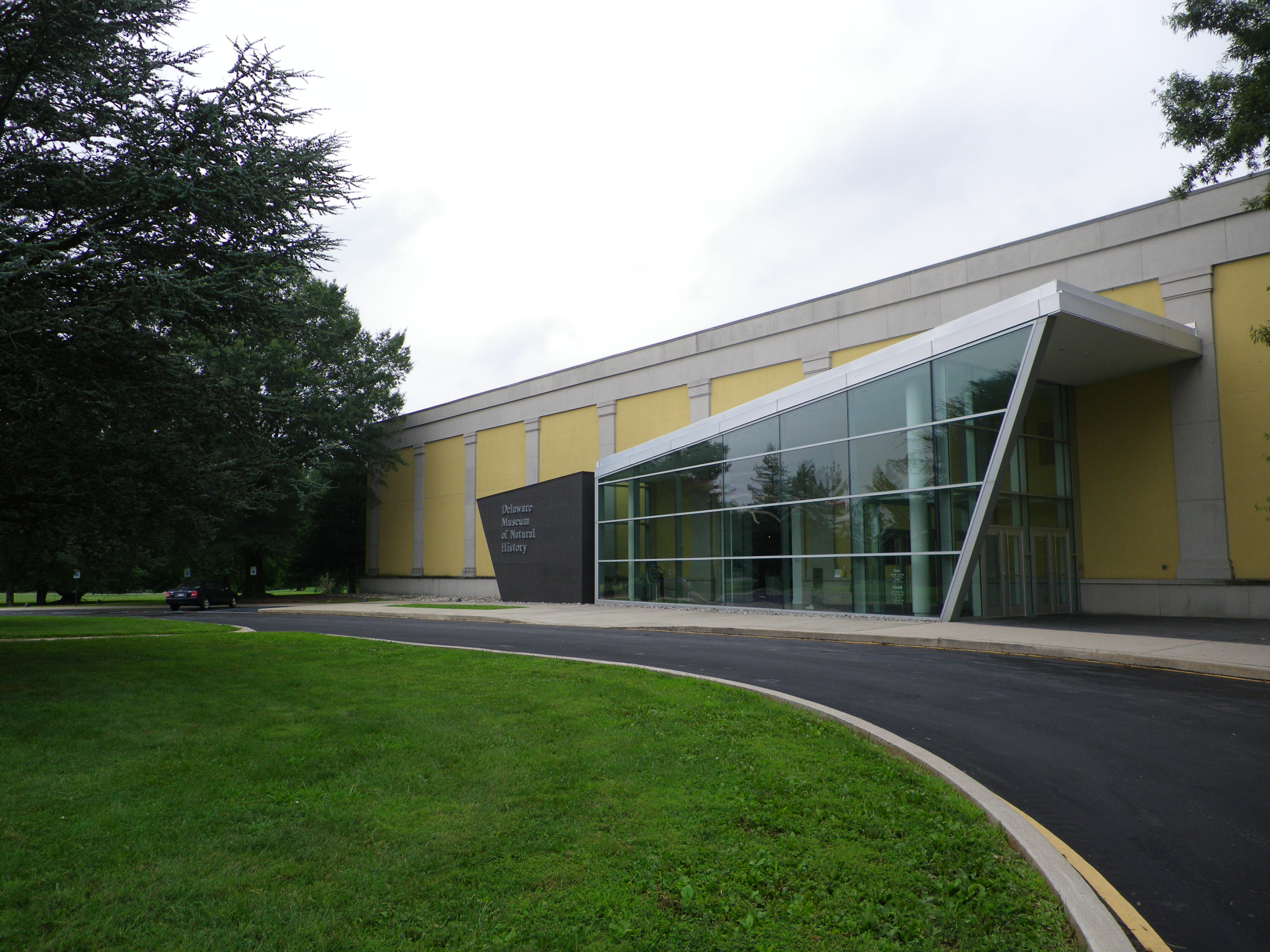
- The museum in 2010

- Location in Delaware Delaware Museum of Nature & Science (the United States)
- Established: 1957 (open to public May 13, 1972)
- Location: 4840 Kennett Pike, Wilmington, Delaware, 19807 USA; 302.658.9111
- Coordinates: 39.798307°N 75.609804°W
- Type: Natural history
- Visitors: Over 65,000
- Public transit access: DART First State bus: 52
- Website: www.delmnh.org

The Delaware Museum of Nature & Science (DMNH, formerly Delaware Museum of Natural History) is a museum located in Wilmington, Delaware. The museum was founded in 1957 by John Eleuthere du Pont near Greenville, Delaware; it opened in 1972 on a site near Winterthur, Delaware. It was re-opened on January 1, 2022, after being closed for two years. It is known for its extensive collections of seashells, birds, and bird eggs. The latter is the second largest collection in North America. It is the oldest natural history museum in Delaware.

== History ==
The museum's core collection was started in childhood by the naturalist, philanthropist and high-profile convicted murderer John E. ("Golden Eagle") du Pont. Du Pont built a personal collection of seashells, birds and bird eggs. Even before getting a doctorate in natural science in 1965 and writing several books on birds, he became interested in developing a natural history museum. During and after graduate school, du Pont took part in several scientific expeditions to the South Pacific and the Philippines, and is credited with the discovery of two dozen subspecies of birds.

At his request, his uncle Henry Francis du Pont provided land across from the Winterthur estate in the Brandywine Valley of Delaware for the museum. The museum opened in 1972 under the name of Delaware Museum of Natural History, attended by 200 du Pont family members and representatives of other Northeastern natural history museums. It was the first major museum of natural history opened since 1910.

The museum originally was based on du Pont's collection of 1,000,000 sea shells and 100,000 bird eggs. The museum emphasizes the ecology of birds and sea life. In early studies, these were used by scientists to measure pesticide contamination of wild species. DMNH is ranked in the top fifteen in the United States for its collections of mollusks and birds, with the second largest collection of birds' eggs in North America.

In 1999, the museum held a contest to name the star designated TYC 3429-697-1. The winning nickname, "The Delaware Diamond", entered in the contest by 12-year-old Wilmington resident Amy Nerlinger, was later recognized by the Delaware General Assembly and the star became an official state symbol in 2000. However, the star was nicknamed through the International Star Registry, making it unofficial and unrecognized by any astronomical authority.

The museum had a major expansion in 2005 to add educational and exhibit space. It has been expanded to include exhibits on dinosaurs, mammals, and Charles Darwin.

In 2020, it was announced the museum would be closing down to renovate. It reopened in 2022 under the current name of the Delaware Museum of Nature and Science. The new museum bears a focus more on state ecology and geology.
