= Arthur Hind (industrialist) =

British-born American businessman and stamp collector

- Arthur Hind and signature from a 1935 auction catalogue.
- Born: Arthur Hind; 1856
- Died: 1933 (aged 76–77)
- Occupation: Industrialist
- Known for: Manufactured textiles; created world class stamp collections

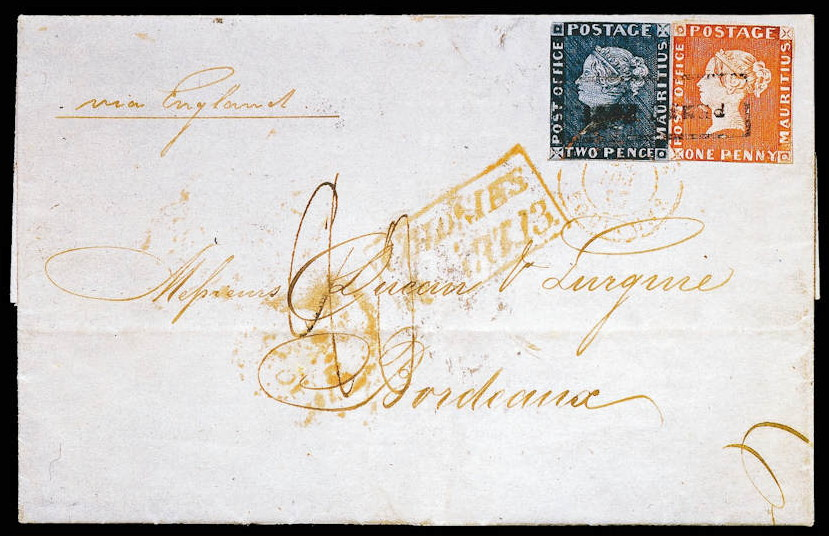
The "Bordeaux Cover" with Mauritius 1d Red and 2d Deep Blue "Post Office" once owned by Arthur Hind.

Arthur Hind (1856–1933), of Utica, New York, was a British-born American textile industrialist and philatelist.

== Business interests ==
He was born in Bradford, United Kingdom, and later lived on Maple Street in Utica, New York, in the Mohawk Valley. He was owner of Hind-Harrison Plush Co. in Clark Mills, New York, which made upholstery fabrics for automobile manufacturers. He immigrated to the United States from Bradford in 1890. He became an American citizen in July 1896.

== Philatelic activity ==
Hind formed a notable collection of stamps of the United States. Like Thomas Tapling, Hind poured the profits from his business into rare stamps, and soon acquired many of the world's greatest rarities. Among these were the Bordeaux Letter, which Roger Calves considered "le plat de résistance (main course) de toute la philatélie" or "the greatest item in all philately", purchased in 1922 from Alfred F. Lichtenstein. He also owned the two "Post Office" Mauritius stamps, both unused, purchased from Henry Duveen. At the Ferrary sale, Hind purchased the One Cent Magenta British Guiana for a world-record price, as well as all of the best U.S. Postmasters' Provisionals.

According to Alexander Séfi, because of his obsession with the "black on magenta," Hind (according to rumor) bought not only one of the stamps, but the other remaining one, and then destroyed one so that he would own the only one in the world.

After Hind died, his American stamps were sold at auction for $247,000, in November 1933. The following February his nephew, F.M.J. Hind, Esq., bought all the remaining stamps from the collection, preventing them from going to auction. He immediately transported them to England.
