= London International Stamp Exhibition 1923 =

The London International Stamp Exhibition was held from 14 to 26 May 1923 in the Royal Horticultural Hall, London. It was organised by the Junior Philatelic Society (now the National Philatelic Society).

One of the key exhibits was the collection of Victoria Half-lengths formed by Charles Lathrop Pack along with his Diligencias. The roof of the hall was shaded to protect the numerous exhibits from the Sun and whitewash was used.
