= Philipp von Ferrary =

Postage stamp collector (1850–1917)

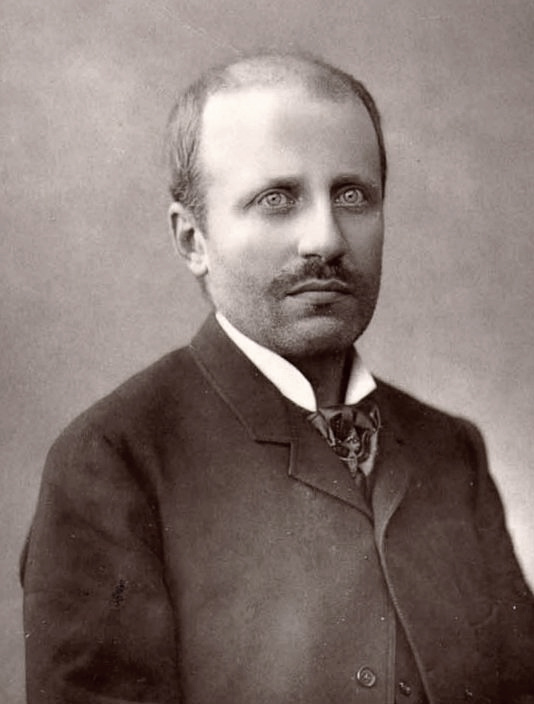
- Philipp von Ferrary
- Born: January 11, 1850; Paris, France
- Died: May 20, 1917 (aged 67); Lausanne, Switzerland
- Occupation: Stamp collector

Philip Ferrari de La Renotière (January 11, 1850 – May 20, 1917) was a noted French-born stamp collector, assembling probably the most complete worldwide collection that ever existed, or is considered likely to exist. Among his extremely rare stamps were the unique Treskilling Yellow of Sweden and the 1856 one-cent "Black on Magenta" of British Guiana.

Of Italian family background, Ferrary took French nationality in 1871, but later became an Austrian national, a fact that ultimately led to the French government seizing, and later auctioning, his stamp collection following his death in 1917. Because France and Austria were enemies during the First World War, Ferrary was himself considered an enemy of France. His adopted nationality also prevented him from returning to France when the war began.

Ferrary's mother allowed the Hôtel Matignon to be used as the embassy of Austria-Hungary, with the "proviso that her son could keep an extensive apartment there for the remainder of his life." Ferrary's collection was kept at the Matignon; this building later became the residence of the Prime Minister of France. He died in Lausanne in May 1917, and was buried in Steinbach am Attersee in Upper Austria. His stamp collection is still considered to have been perhaps the greatest "ever formed".

== Background ==
Ferrary was born in the sumptuous Hôtel Matignon, Rue de Varenne in Paris, where he resided until two years prior to his death. Once the festive gathering place for the Ancien Régime society, at the start of the Bourbon Restoration in 1815, Louis XVIII traded the Hôtel de Matignon for the Élysée Palace. It is now the official residence of the Prime Minister of France.

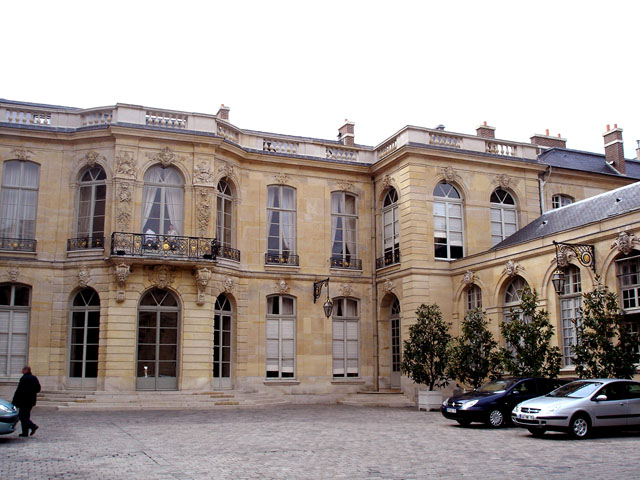
Hôtel Matignon 57 rue de Varenne

Ferrary was the son of the Duke and Duchess of Galliera. His father, Raffaele de Ferrari, came from an ancient and rich family of Genovese bankers and was a wealthy businessman made Duke of Galliera in Genoa by Pope Gregory XVI, and Prince de Lucedio by King Victor Emmanuel II of Italy. Raffaele de Ferrari was co-founder of the Crédit Mobilier with the Péreire brothers, rivals of the Rothschilds, who financed many of the major construction projects of the second half of the 19th century: railroads in Austria, Latin America, Portugal, upper Italy and France (the Paris-Lyon-Marseille line), the digging of the Fréjus Rail Tunnel and the Suez Canal, and the reconstruction of Paris designed by Baron Haussmann. It is said that Raffaele de Ferrari died stuck in one of his immense safes.

Ferrary's mother, the Duchess of Galliera, born Maria de Brignole-Sale, was the great-niece of the Princess of Monaco and daughter of the Marquis Antoine de Brignole-Sale, ambassador of the Kingdom of Sardinia in Paris, under the Restoration and during the reign of Louis-Philippe I. After the death of Ferrary's father, the Duchess proposed that Prince Philippe, Count of Paris (heir apparent to the French throne) take up residence at the Rue de Varenne. He came to occupy the ground floor of the Hôtel Matignon. The Duchess soon became disenchanted with the adverse social environment for the monarchists, quit Paris, and left Hôtel Matignon to the Austro-Hungarian Emperor, who made it his embassy in France. Upon the death of his father, Ferrary renounced all of the titles. He was then adopted by the Austrian Count de La Renotière von Kriegsfeld and he adopted Austrian nationality. It is said that Ferrary was illegitimate and that he was adopted by his natural father. Thereafter, he preferred the name "Ferrary"; his calling card reads "Philipp von Ferrary". Collectors and dealers usually refer to him simply as "Ferrary".

Ferrary adopted a new nationality more than once in his life. He was born an Italian in France, and took French nationality in 1871. After his father died in 1876, he was adopted by Count von Kriegsfeld and took Austrian nationality as mentioned above; he adopted the right of residence in Braunau in 1885, an act equivalent to taking Austrian nationality. In 1908, he took Swiss citizenship but remained an Austrian national. He was in Holland when the First World War began, and his nationality prevented him from returning to France. There is also mention that he obtained Serbian nationality through his friendly relations with the ruling Obrenović dynasty.

Records show he may have returned to Paris in 1916, which would have been the last time he saw his collection. France seized his stamp collection as war reparations, because as an Austrian citizen he was "technically an enemy of France." Ferrary had also "clearly expressed pro-German views," and called Germany "his dear country." Regardless, his visits to France were becoming more rare. His collection was seized "under provisions of the Treaty of Versailles that came into effect in January 1920," and auctioned off after his death, from 1921 to 1926. The French government decided that proceeds from the auction would be "deducted from the war reparations owed by Germany to France." The one-cent magenta was sold in 1922, to British-born American collector Arthur Hind.

== Philately ==
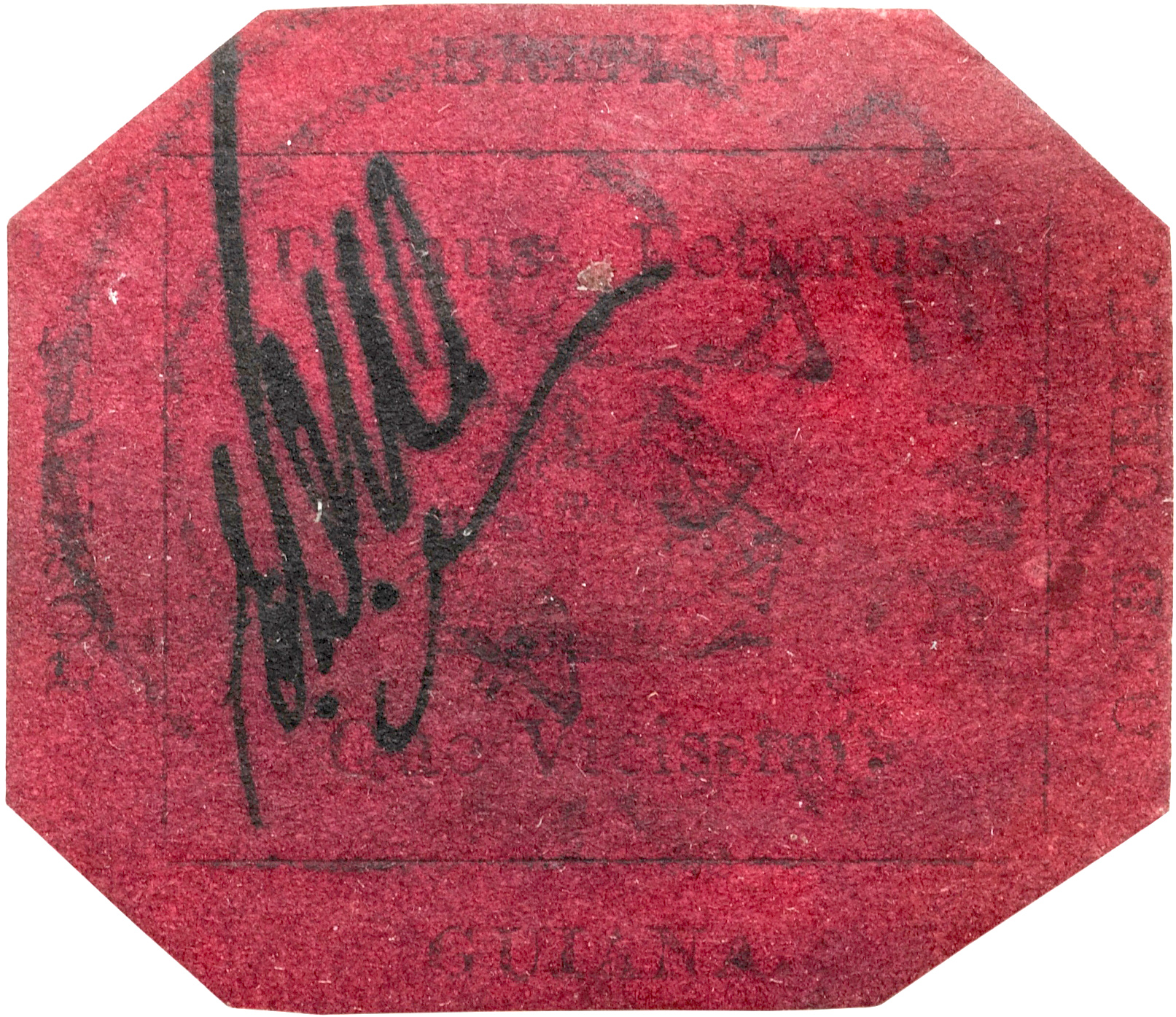
The British Guiana 1c magenta

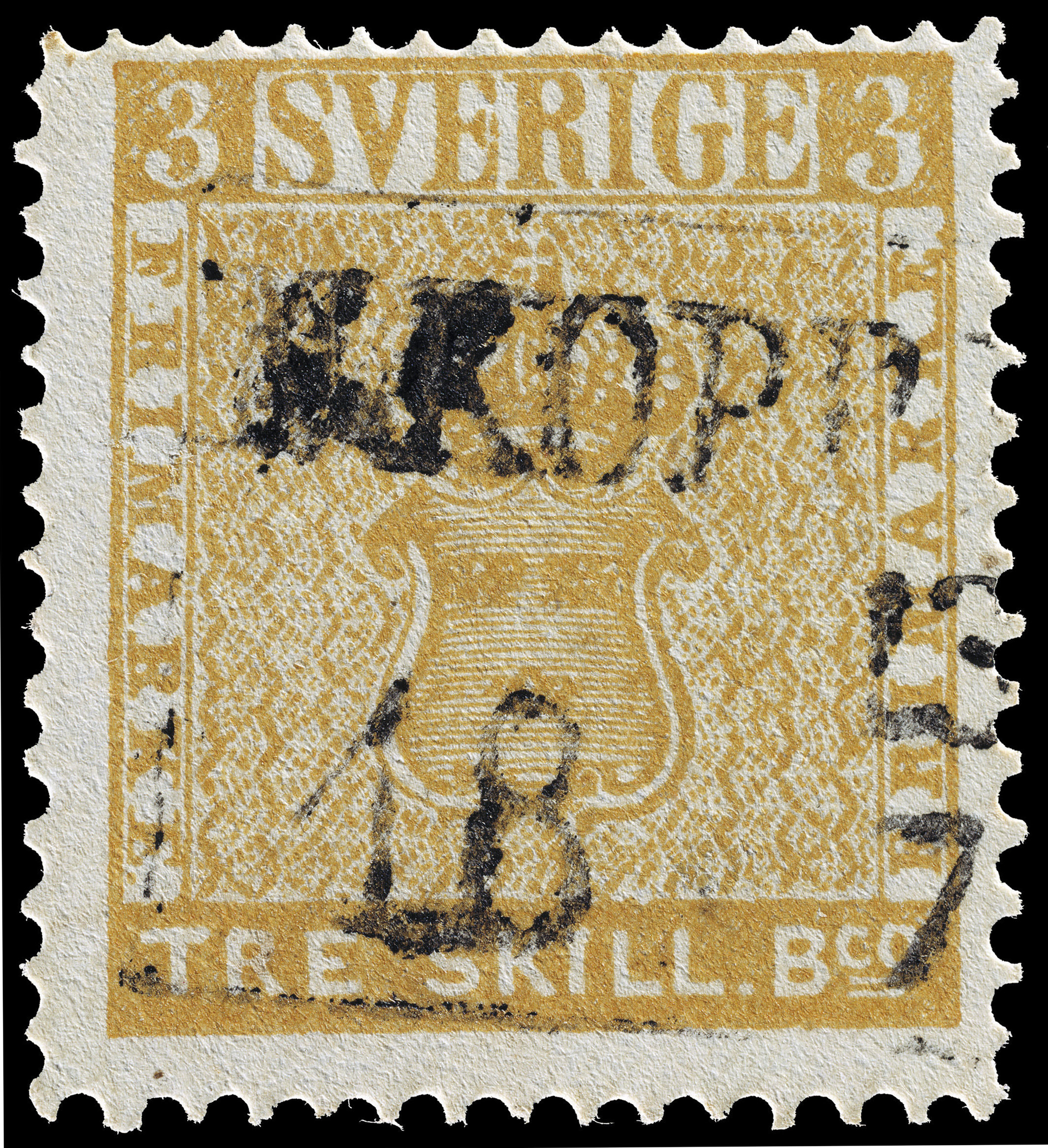
The Treskilling Yellow

Ferrary started collecting in his youth, and then he inherited a great fortune of approximately 120,000,000 French francs (£5 million), which he dedicated to the purchase of rare stamps and coins. His collection is believed to have been the greatest ever assembled, and it may never be equalled. Amongst his extremely rare stamps were the unique Treskilling Yellow of Sweden and the 1856 one-cent "Black on Magenta" of British Guiana, which he bought in 1878 for £150 and which after his death was sold at the third bid of his collection, in 1924, at Paris for 36,000 US dollars. He also owned the only unused copy of the Two Cent Hawaii Missionary of 1851, for which its owner, Gaston Leroux, had been murdered by a fellow collector. Another piece owned by Ferrary was the only known cover featuring both values of the first Mauritius "Post Office" stamps, which has been called "the greatest item in all philately".

He purchased many important old collections, including those of Judge Frederick A. Philbrick (1835-1910) for £7,000, Sir Daniel Cooper's for £3,000, and W. B. Thornhill's Australians, and was a large buyer in the leading capitals of Europe for a great many years. Stanley Gibbons said that his expenditure with them averaged from £3,000 to £4,000 a year.

According to F. J. Peplow of Great Britain, in his book The Postage Stamps of Buenos Aires, the first clue that an inverted cliché existed on the Buenos Aires “In Ps” plate of the “barquitos” (steamships) was the report of a single stamp with part of the adjoining stamp rotated 180 degrees and it had been acquired by Ferrary for his collection.

He employed Pierre Mahé, a leading Paris stamp dealer, as a consultant or curator to examine and keep order in his collection from 1874 until Mahé died in 1913. Also, he had two secretaries, who were paid large salaries: one to look after the postage stamps and the other the postcards, envelopes, and newspaper wrappers. Ferrary had his own stamp room furnished with numerous fan cabinets.

Although he lived in Paris, Ferrary travelled frequently, meeting with dealers along the way, and often paying them in gold on the spot. He was impulsive in his buying and seemed to be indifferent to price, so dealers and counterfeiters took advantage of him. Exceptionally dangerous forgeries gained the nickname "Ferrarities".

== Numismatics ==
Ferrary also assembled a large collection of rare coins. His British numismatic collection was sold by Sotheby, Wilkinson & Hodge in London over five days from 27–31 March 1922. The title of the sale did not mention Ferrary by name, but read as follows: “Catalogue of the Famous and Remarkable Collection of British and Colonial Coins, Patterns & Proofs from George III to the Present Day, Formed by a Nobleman, Recently Deceased.” The catalogue had 710 lots and 15 plates. Other sales of his French and ancient coins were held in Paris.

== The "Nobleman" Sales ==
Wishing to make his unequalled collection accessible to the public, in his will dated 30 January 1915 he bequeathed it to "the German nation" for display in the Postmuseum in Berlin, along with funds for maintenance, 30,000 guldens. He also stipulated that the collection was "not to be integrated into the existing postal museum collection" but was to be "exhibited in a separate room". But as a citizen of Austria living in France, World War I put him at risk. Leaving his several hundred albums in the Austrian embassy, he fled to Vienna early in 1915 and then to Switzerland where he died soon afterwards, and so did not see the dismantling of his life's work after the war. The French government confiscated Ferrary's collection, claiming it as a war reparation. The massive assemblage was auctioned off between 1921 and 1926, in 14 separate sales, realizing some 30 million francs.

These sales enabled several famous collectors at the time to acquire the rarest philatelic items known, which, arguably, contributed to the development of the hobby in the first part of the 20th century. The British Guiana 1c magenta was bought by American collector Arthur Hind, who outbid King George V of Britain. The Treskilling Yellow error of Sweden, after changing hands several times, was acquired in 1937 by King Carol II of Romania. The "Bordeaux cover" of Mauritius "Post Office" stamps was acquired, at different time by collectors such as Sir Ernest de Silva, Arthur Hind, Alfred F. Lichtenstein, and Alfred H. Caspary. Caspary (a well-known New York collector) also acquired the only unused copy of the 2 cent Hawaiian Missionaries stamp, which had also belonged to Ferrary. The Buenos Aires “Barquitos” (Steamships) horizontal tête-bêche pair appeared in the Ferrary sale held on June 13, 1923. It realized FFr 37,600 (US $2,400) (including the 17.5% surcharge), an extraordinary sum for the time. It was acquired by Alfred F. Lichtenstein.

Lieut. Colonel G.S.F. Napier compiled an index of the fourteen catalogues from the sales which was sold in aid of funds for the Royal Philatelic Society London.

After the dismantling of Ferarry's collection, these stamps have never again been (and are unlikely to ever be) part of the same philatelic collection. In that respect, Ferrary's collection remains unique in the history of philately. Today, many of the rarest stamps extant on the philatelic market proudly bear an "ex-Ferrary" in their provenance, which tends to raise considerably their desirability and value.

== Death and legacy ==
Ferrary died in Lausanne, 20 May 1917. He "suffered a fatal heart attack in a taxicab, reportedly returning from a visit with a local stamp dealer." His last resting place, as "Philipp Arnold", is in Steinbach am Attersee, a village on Lake Attersee in the province of Upper Austria. He had been a frequent visitor to the Attersee, where he bought a house in 1890, and had been a generous benefactor to the community in the guise of "a friend of Austria".

Ferrary is featured on a 1968 stamp of Liechtenstein, 30 rp red brown, Scott no. 448, SG no. 496.

== See also ==
- Buenos Aires 1859 1p "In Ps" tete-beche pair

== References and sources ==
Sources

- František Žampach, "Pan Filatelista - Pan Filip de Ferrari", Japhila (in Czech)
- O. Gross, K. Gryżewsky - "Incursiune în lumea timbrelor". (Romanian translation, Ed. Albatros - Bucharest - 1983)
