= Diljit Singh Virk =

Indian philatelist

Brigadier Diljit Singh Virk (23 May 1914 – 21 July 1997) was an Indian philatelist who was added to the Roll of Distinguished Philatelists in 1993.

Brig D. S. Virk joined the Postal Department in 1939 and then volunteered for Indian Army Post Office during World War II. He served with the Pai Force and also in the Middle East Command. He was the postal officer of the British Indian Contingent of the Occupation Force in Japan. In 1968 he was awarded the Ati Vishisht Seva Medal (AVSM) a military award given to recognize "distinguished service of an exceptional order" by the President of India. He was entrusted to raise the Army Postal Service and as a result on 1 March 1972 Army Postal Service Corps was raised as a separate corps of the Army under the stewardship of Brig. D. S. Virk as its first director.

Brig D. S. Virk was a member of the Philatelic Advisory Committee for many years. He was a founder member of the Philatelic Congress of India and has served as Bureau member of Literature Commission (1988–92) and Postal History (1978–88) at FIP. He was invited to sign the Roll of Distinguished Philatelists (RDP) at a ceremony held at Edinburgh that coincided with the 75th Philatelic Congress of Great Britain on 18 September 1993. He is the second Indian philatelist to be honoured to sign RDP. So far Mr. D. N. Jatia (1983) and Brig. Virk have been so honoured. He was the Vice President and later the President of the Philatelic Congress of India (1994).

Brigadier Virk had published excellent research on the movement of Field Post Offices (FPO) during the Second World War. His interest was in the Postal History and he wrote a number of books as the sole author / co-author such as Indian Army Post Offices - Locations and Movements 1939–47, Postal Censorship in India, 1939–1945, Postal History of Indian Campaigns: China Expeditionary Force 1900 -1923, Postal History of Indian Military Campaigns: Sikkim-Tibet, 1903–1908, Indian Army Post Offices in the Second World War, Army Post Offices and Philately: A collection of articles. His publication Indian Postal History, 1873-1923: Gleanings from Post Office Records won the Martin Memorial Trophy of the India Study Circle in 1991. Brig. D. S. Virk is known as the doyen of the Forces Philately in India.
