= Percy Bishop =

Percy Bishop may refer to:

- Percy Cooke Bishop (1869–1961), British journalist and philatelist
- Percy Poe Bishop (1877–1967), U.S. Army general
