= Roll of Distinguished Philatelists =

Philatelic award

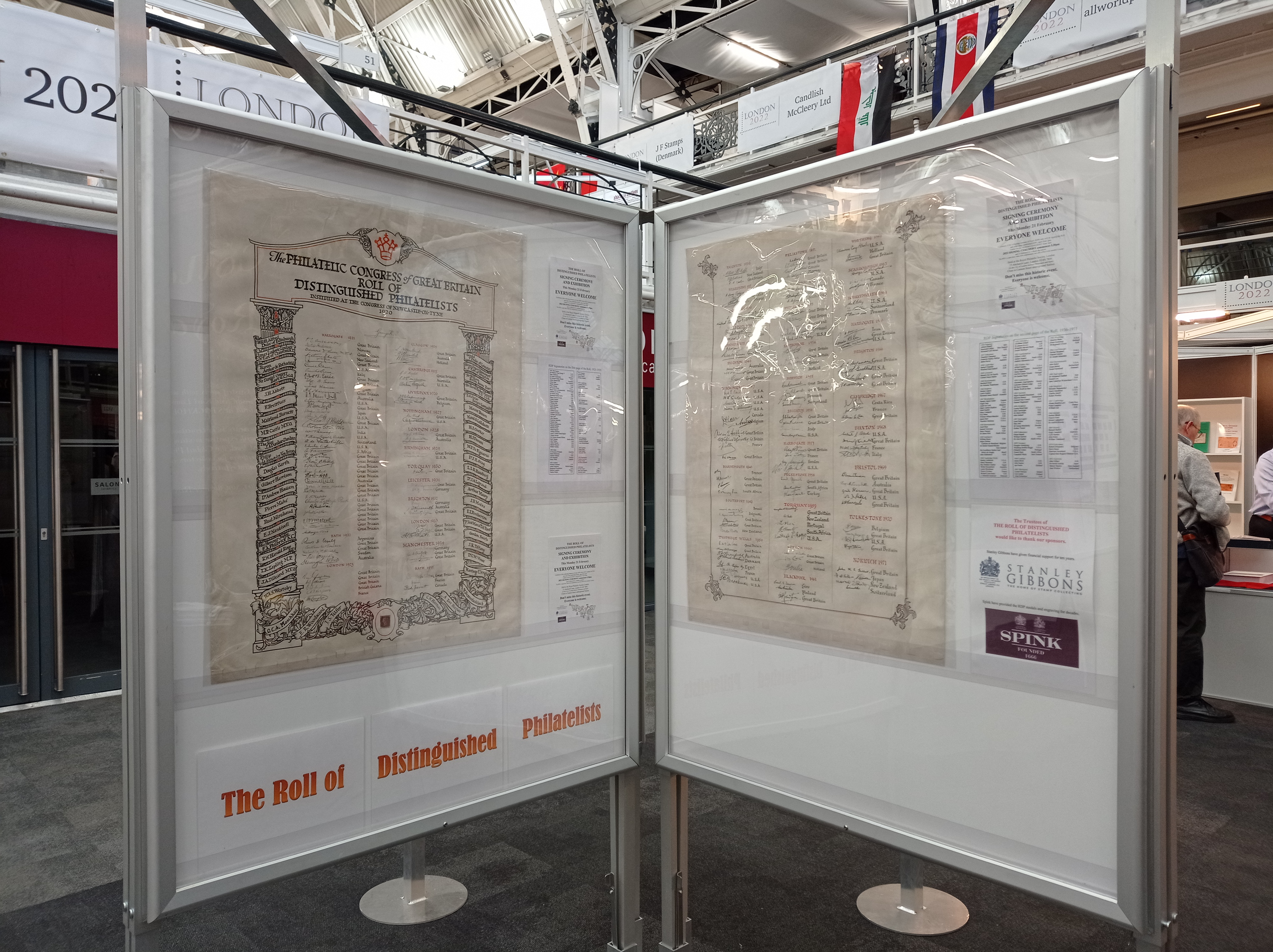
First two pages of the Roll on display at the London 2022 International Stamp Exhibition, February 2022

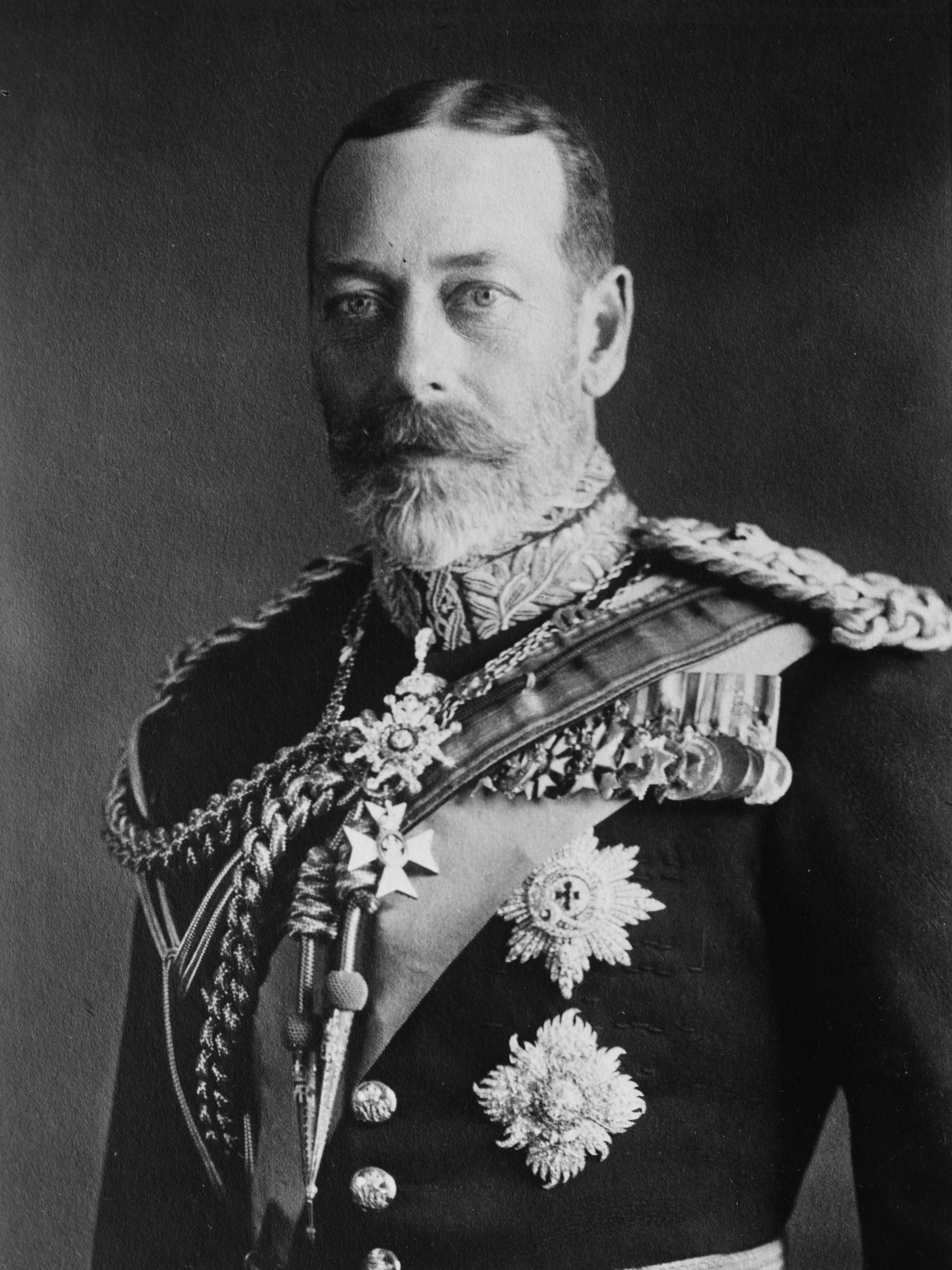
King George V was the first signatory to the Roll.

The Roll of Distinguished Philatelists (RDP) is a philatelic award of international scale, created by the Philatelic Congress of Great Britain in 1921 to honour those who have advanced philately through research, expertise, or service. The Roll consists of five pieces of parchment to which the signatories add their names. New honorees continue to be added annually.

== Selection of the signatories ==
Those who have assisted the development of philately through their research, expertise or giving their time can be candidates to sign the Roll if they are sponsored by one of the existing signatories. The following four years, the candidate is examined once a year with the other current ones by a Board of election.

The ceremony of signature of the Roll happens at the annual Philatelic Congress of Great Britain. Under the Congress' rules, the signatories can talk and vote during the Congress.

Forty-two philatelists were honoured posthumously on the first page of the Roll as "Fathers of Philately".

Four other names were added in the 1950s at the bottom of the first page. In 1951, Edward R. Woodward (died 1931) and J. Stanley Telfer (died 1938) were honoured by the Board of election because they were two important philatelists and member of the Board. In 1956, because the Board was sure they would have been called to sign the Roll if they would have lived longer, United States citizen Clarence W. Hennan and A. Tort Nicolau of Spain were added too.

== History of the Roll ==
On 30 October 1919, Percy C. Bishop, a member of the London Stamp Club, proposed the institution of an "Philatelic Order of Merit" to honour philatelic writers. This order would be given more importance than existing philatelic prizes and would have an international importance. In late 1919, F. H. Vallencey, president of the club, presented the idea to the readers of his Stamp Collecting paper. In March 1920, a jury of five published a list of twenty-five names who the jury selected from the ninety-one names sent by the readers and British associations.

However, to gain official recognition, the London Stamp Club let the associative members of the 1920 Philatelic Congress of Great Britain in Newcastle upon Tyne decide the future of Bishop's idea. A sub-committee was constituted to find a new name and write rules of the award.

At the 1921 Congress in Harrogate, the "Roll of Distinguished Philatelists" was created without any discussion. The subcommittee has already got the signature of King and philatelist George V on the printed parchment, the twenty-four of the selected by the first jury and fifteen other philatelists were already invited to sign the Roll on the last day of the Congress.

Starting in 1922, the selection of the signatories was annual except between the Congresses of 1940 and 1946 because of World War II.

== The "fathers of philately" ==
The names of forty-two deceased philatelists are printed on the Roll page that was signed between 1921 and 1935. They were placed in the ribbons that ornate the two columns on each side of the page. They were included as "fathers of philately".

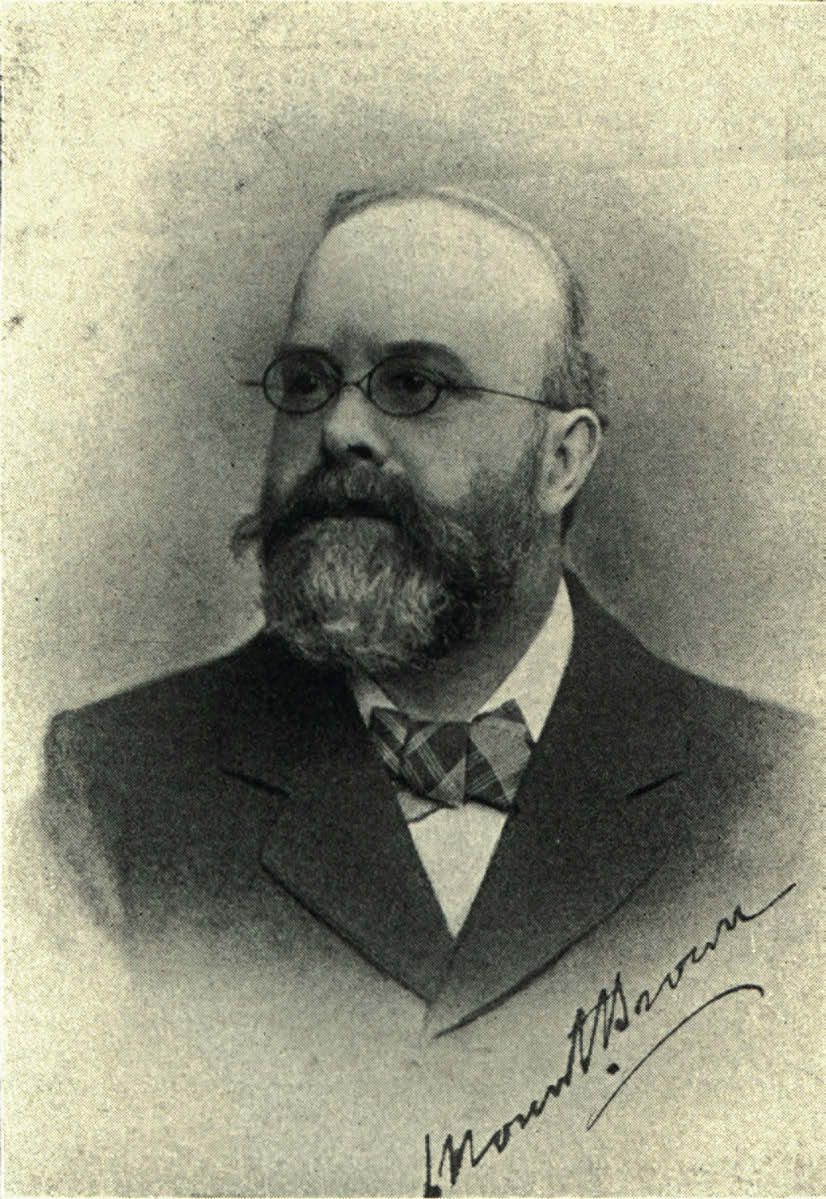
Mount Brown

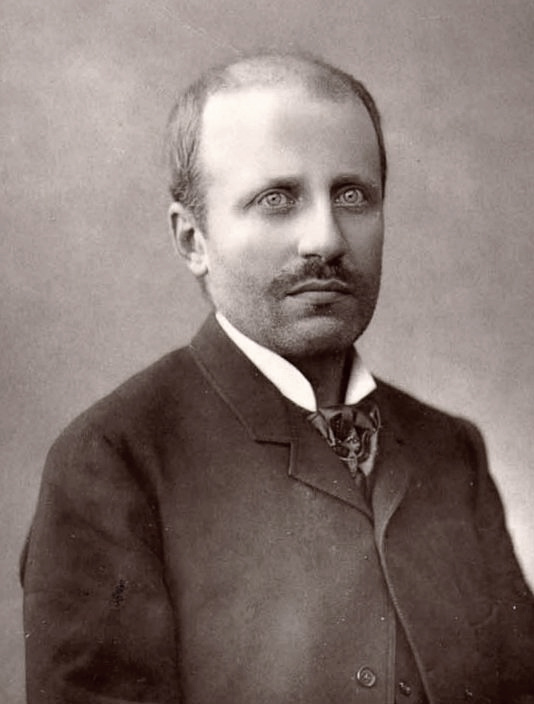
Philipp von Ferrary

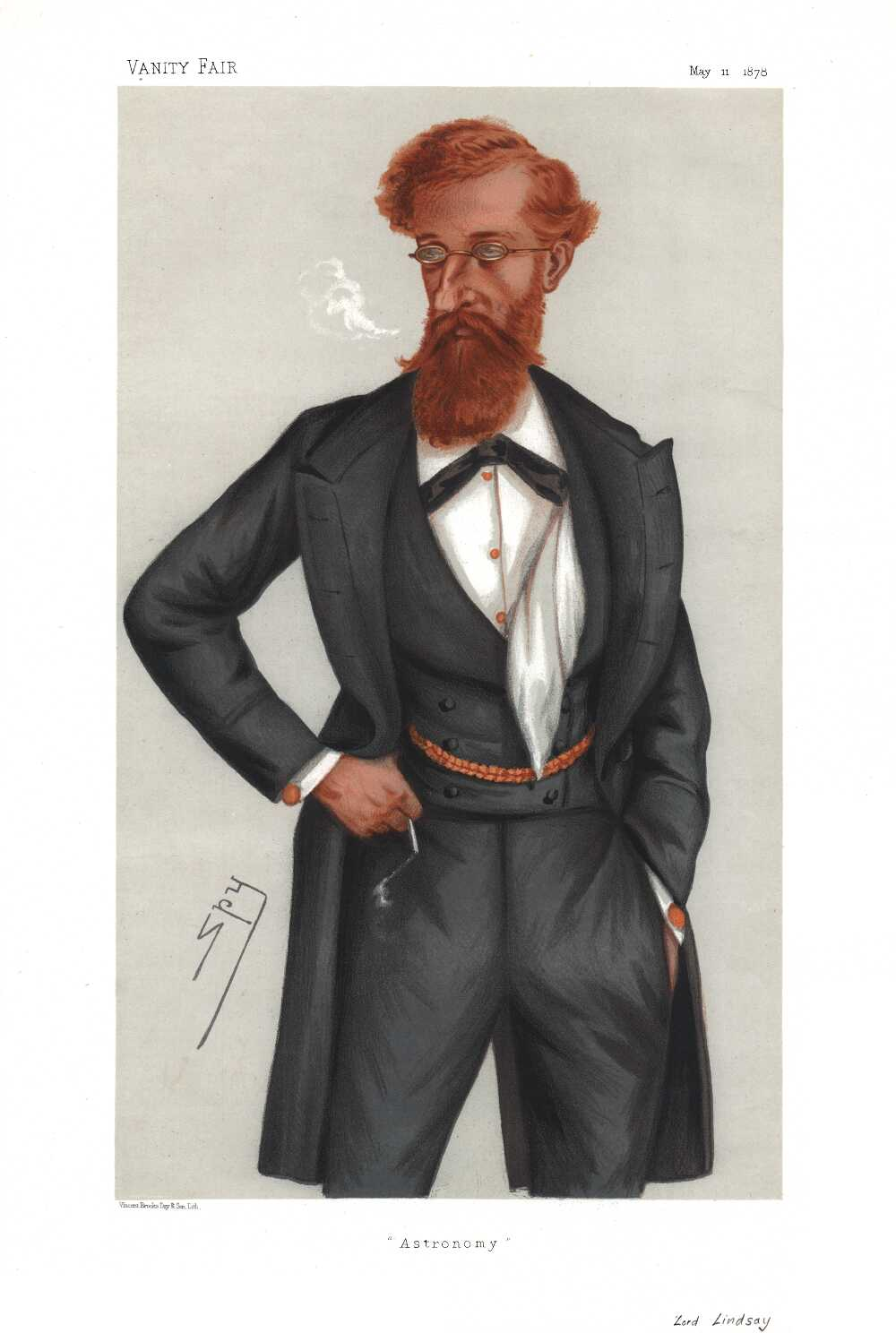
James Lindsay, 26th Earl of Crawford

Thomas Keay Tapling

- James H. Abbott (1851–1914, United Kingdom), pioneer of the overprint collection.
- Sir William Beilby Avery (1854–1908, United Kingdom), director of W & T Avery Ltd., great collector.
- François Georges Oscar Berger-Levrault (1823–1906, France), printer and collector, author of the first stamp catalogue in 1862.
- Friedrich Andreas Breitfuss (1851–1911, Russia), one of the collectors of essays and proofs.
- Mount Brown (1837–1919, United Kingdom), author of a stamp catalogue between 1862 and 1864.
- Maitland Burnett (1844–1918, United Kingdom), editor of The Philatelic Record.
- Gustave (1848–1894) and Martial Caillebotte (1853–1910, France), artists and stamp collectors.
- Marcellus Purnell Castle (1849–1917, United Kingdom), President of the Royal Philatelic Society London from 1913 to 1917, editor of The London Philatelist.
- Daniel Cooper (1821–1902, United Kingdom), first President of the Philatelic Society, London from 1869 to 1878.
- Henry J. Crocker (1861–1912, United States), great collector.
- J. A. Dunbar-Dunbar (1849–1905, United Kingdom), a Scottish reverend, his Australian collection went to the Museum of Science and Art in Edinburgh.
- Henry J. Duveen (born in the Netherlands), important collector.
- Alfred, Duke of Edinburgh (1844–1900, United Kingdom), King George V's uncle, Honorary President of the Philatelic Society, London of 1890 to 1900.
- Philip la Renotiere von Ferrary (c. 1859 – 1917, Austria), rich buyer of stamps and stationery from many countries.
- Douglas Garth (15 May 1852 – 6 January 1900 United Kingdom), Honorary Secretary of the Philatelic Society, London from 1888 to 1894, collector of India.
- John Edward Gray (1800–1875, United Kingdom), zoologist at the British Museum, author of A Hand Catalogue for the Use of Collectors.
- Gilbert Harrison (1858–1894, United Kingdom), specialist of Afghanistan and Portuguese India.
- Leslie Leopold Rudolph Hausburg (1872–1917, United Kingdom), Honorary Secretary of the Royal Philatelic Society London from 1913 to 1917, spécialist of plating.
- Andrew Houison (1850–1912, Australia), specialist of the postal history of New South Wales.
- Henry King-Tenison, 8th Earl of Kingston (1848–1896, United Kingdom), President of the Philatelic Society, London from 1892 to 1896.
- Jacques Amable Legrand (1820–1912, France), pioneer of philately in France, inventor of the perforation gauge.
- Gerald FitzGerald, 5th Duke of Leinster (1851–1897, United Kingdom), important Irish collector.
- James Lindsay, 26th Earl of Crawford (1847–1913, United Kingdom), President of the Royal Philatelic Society London from 1910 to 1913, bibliophile, one of the first to include essays and proofs in his collections.
- Pierre Mahé (1833–1913, France), stamp dealer in Paris, in charge of Philipp von Ferrary's collection.
- David Parkes Masson (1857–1915, United Kingdom), specialist of India.
- Arthur Maury (1844–1907, France), stamp dealer in Paris, philatelic author and journalist, editor of Le Collectionneur de timbres-poste.
- Paul Mirabaud (1848–1908, France), specialist of Switzerland.
- Jean-Baptiste Moens (1833–1908, Belgium), stamp dealer in Brussels and philatelic author.
- Edward J. Nankivell (1848–1909, United Kingdom), journalist founder of The Postage Stamp in 1907, collector of China, New Zealand and Transvaal.
- Maria Pardo de Figueroa (1828–1918, Spain), one of the first specialist of postal markings.
- Edward Loines Pemberton (1844–1878, United Kingdom), stamp dealer and philatelic author, founding member of the Philatelic Society, London.
- Frederick Adolphus Philbrick (1835–1910, United Kingdom), founding member of the Philatelic Society, London.
- Dr. José Marcó del Pont (1851–1917, Argentina), specialist of Argentina and Latin America.
- Arthur de Rothschild (1851–1903, Belgium), collector of unused stamps issued between 1860 and 1880.
- Harold Row (1840–1919, United Kingdom), collector of Siam.
- Gordon Smith (1856–1905, United Kingdom), specialist of South Australia and director of Stanley Gibbons.
- Thomas Keay Tapling (1855–1891, United Kingdom), pioneer of stamp collecting.
- John Kerr Tiffany (1842–1897, United States), first President of the American Philatelic Society, specialist of the United States and bibliophile.
- John Alexander Tilleard (1850–1913, United Kingdom), Honorary Secretary of the Royal Philatelic Society London from 1894 to 1913, Keeper of the Royal Philatelic Collection from 1910 to 1913.
- Charles William Viner (1812–1906, United Kingdom), already a collector in 1860, writer for philatelic papers, founding member and Honorary Secretary (1871–1874) of the Philatelic Society, London.
- William Amos Scarborough Westoby (1815–1899, United Kingdom), philatelic journalist.
- Hastings Elwin Wright (1861–1897, United Kingdom), collector of British stamps in high quality state.

In 2021, two new names were added to the "fathers of philately" to represent the many German and Austrian philatelists who were omitted due to anti-German feeling when the roll was created immediately after the end of the First World War:

- Alfred Moschkau (1848–1912, Germany)
- Victor Suppantschitsch (1838–1919, Austria)

== List of signatories ==
=== 1921 ===
Among the forty first signatories are twenty-four out of the twenty-five proposed by the initial jury in 1920:

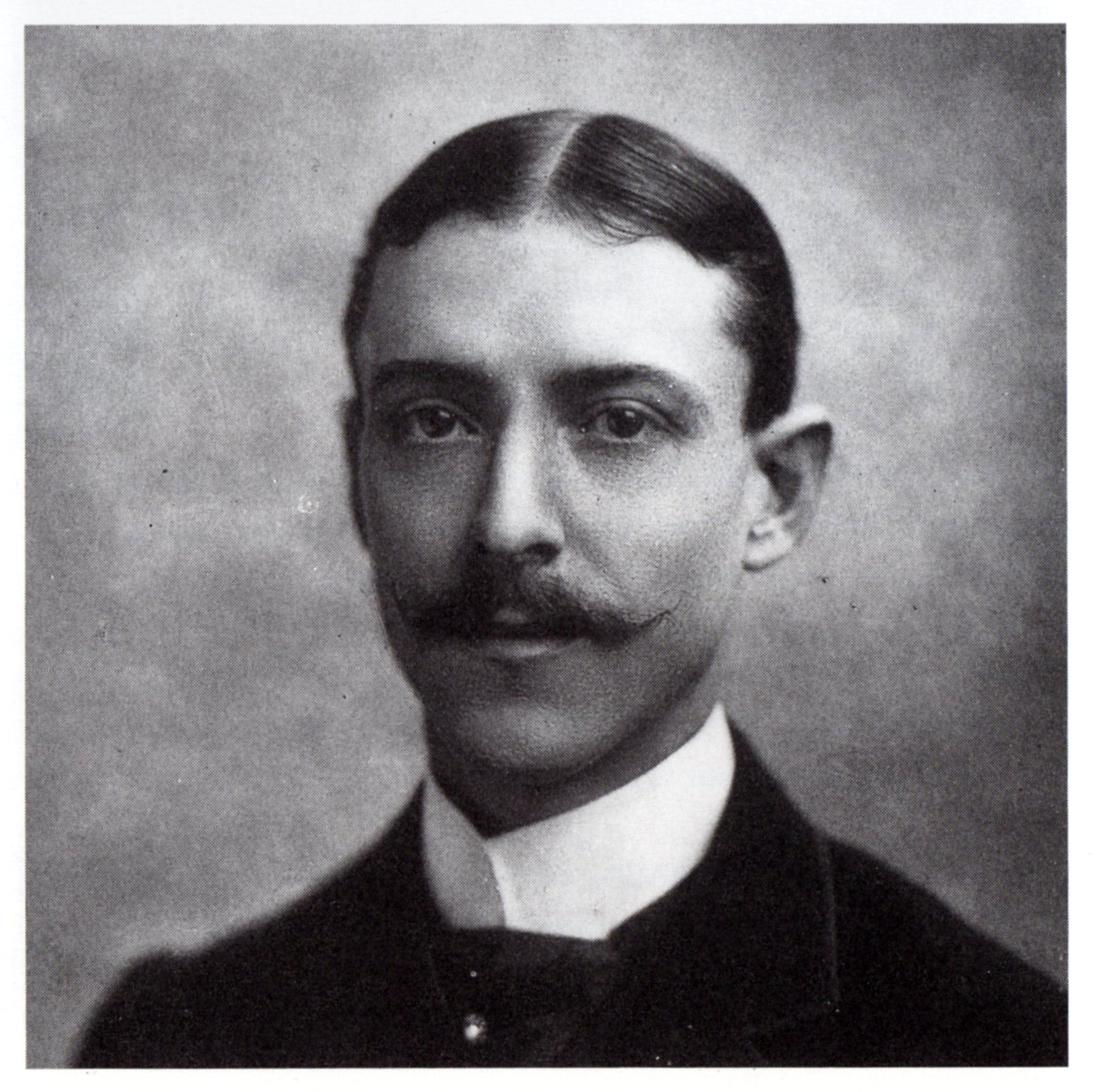
Edward Denny Bacon

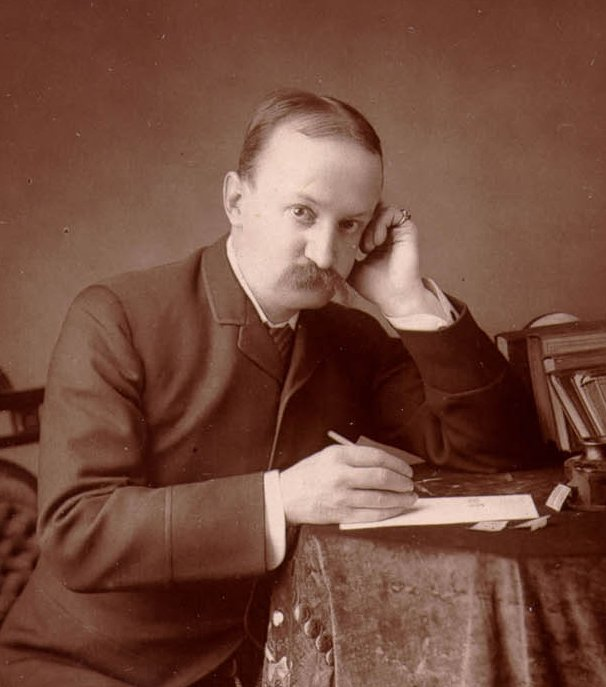
Edward B. Evans

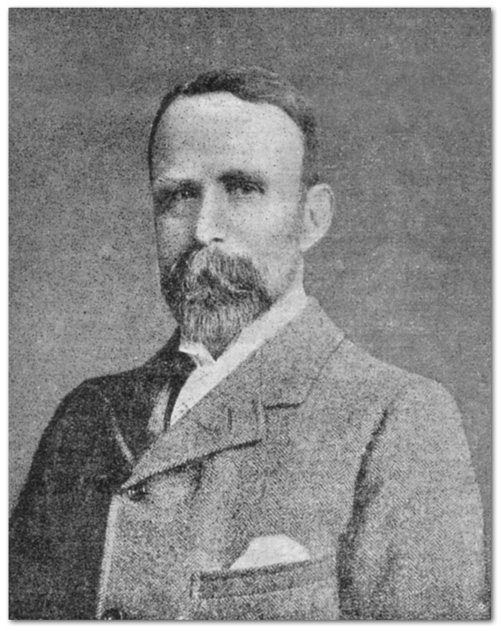
William Russell Lane-Joynt

- Peter John Anderson (1853–1926, United Kingdom), bibliophile and historian of philatelic literature.
- Dr. Justus Anderssen (1867–1938, Norway), specialist of the stamps of Norway.
- Edward Denny Bacon (1860–1938, United Kingdom), President of the Philatelic Society London from 1917 to 1923, Curator of the Royal Philatelic Collection from 1913 to 1938.
- Arthur Thomas Bate (c. 1850–1922, New Zealand), specialist of the stamps of New Zealand.
- Walter Dorning Beckton (1866–1931, United Kingdom), precursor of the "scientific philately" and of the "Manchester School", President of the Manchester Philatelic Society, of the first Philatelic Congress of Great Britain in 1909 and of the Royal Philatelic Society London from 1929 to 1931.
- Carroll Chase (1878-1960, United States), specialist of the stamps of the United States, President of the American Philatelic Society in 1920 and 1922.
- Emilio Diena (1860–1941, Italy), specialist of the stamps of the Italian States.
- Robert Brisco Earée (1846–1928, United Kingdom), specialist of the forged stamps.
- Edward Benjamin Evans (1846–1922, United Kingdom).
- Louis Hanciau (1835–1924, Belgium), brother-in-law and associate of Jean-Baptiste Moens.
- Harry L. Hayman (1850–1927, United Kingdom).
- Arthur Francis Basset Hull (1862–1945, Australia), specialist of the stamps of the Australian colonies.
- Clifton A. Howes (vers 1860–1936, United States), specialist of North America, the United Kingdom and some Eastern Asian countries, President of the American Philatelic Society from 1915 to 1917.
- William Russell Lane-Joynt (1855–1921, United Kingdom), Honorary Curator of the Duke of Leinster's collection at the Dublin Museum of Science and Art.
- Umejiro Kimura (1869–1927, Japan), specialist of the stamps of Japan, President of Yuraku-kai from 1912 to 1927.
- John Nicholas Luff (United States), founding member of the Collectors Club of New York and President of the American Philatelic Society.
- Charles James Phillips (1863–1940, United Kingdom, then United States), owner of Stanley Gibbons from 1890 to 1922, then a rare stamp dealer in New York.
- Bertram William Henry Poole (1880–1950, United States), philatelic journalist, specialist of Haiti and Latin America, and a stamp dealer after 1916.
- Winter Charles Renouf (1868–1954, India), marcophilelatist specialist of British India.
- William Reynolds Ricketts (1869–1945, United States), bibliophile.
- Axel de Reuterskiöld (Switzerland), specialist of the stamps of Switzerland.
- Charles Esterly Severn (United States), philatelic journalist.
- Emil Tamsen (1861–1957, South Africa), specialist of British Africa.
- Robert Blake Yardley (1858–1943, United Kingdom), President of the Royal Philatelic Society London from 1931 to 1934.

Chosen by the 1920 jury, the British A. B. Creeke was forgotten by the Philatelic Congress' subcommittee in 1921.

The subcommittee added fifteen philatelists in 1921 with a larger majority of Britons than in the 1920 jury's selection.

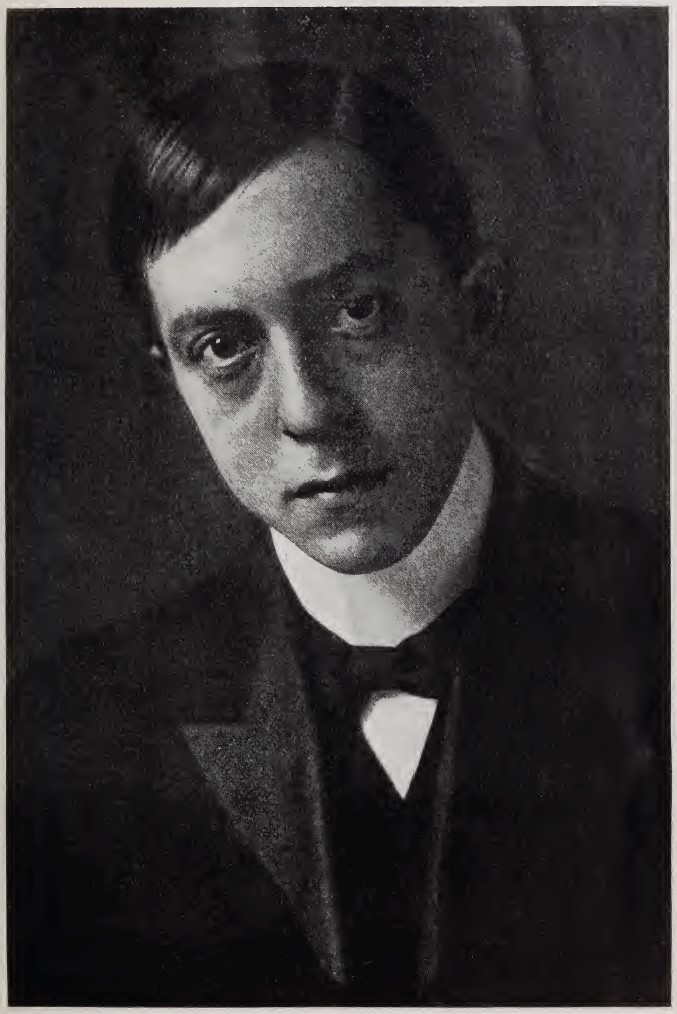
Frederick John Melville

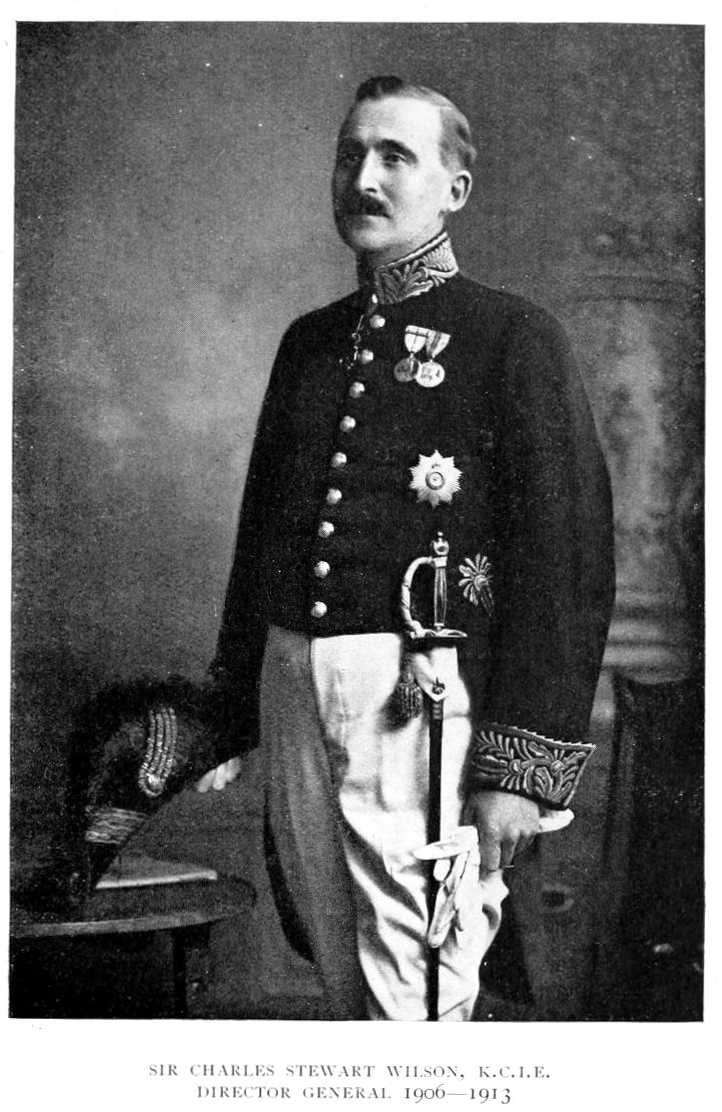
Charles Stewart Wilson

- Percy Cooke Bishop (1869–1961, United Kingdom), philatelic journalist and proposer of the Roll of Distinguished Philatelist.
- Lionel William Fulcher (1865–1945, United Kingdom), first organizer of the Royal Philatelic Society London's library whom he was the Honorary Librarian from 1903 to 1928.
- Hugo Griebert (1867–1924, United Kingdom), London stamp dealer and author.
- Thomas William Hall (1861–1937, United Kingdom), President of the Royal Philatelic Society London from 1923 to 1929.
- David Haworth Hill (1851–1926, Australia), specialist of the stamps of the State of Victoria.
- John Morris Marsden (1857–1939, United Kingdom), specialist of Portugal and its colonies.
- Frederick John Melville (1883–1940, United Kingdom), writer and bibliophile, founder of the Junior Philatelic Society in 1899.
- Francis John Hamilton Scott Napier (1850–1929, United Kingdom), author.
- Charles Lathrop Pack (1857–1937, United States), spécialist, among other topics, of the stamps figuring Queen Victoria.
- Percival Loines Pemberton (1875–1949, United Kingdom), stamp dealer and editor in chief of The Philatelic Journal of Great Britain.
- John Walker (1855–1927, United Kingdom), President, Honorary Librarian and Curator of the forged stamp collection of the Scottish Philatelic Society.
- Arthur John Warren (1847–1930, United Kingdom), specialist of the Netherlands and its colonies.
- Harold William Wescott (United Kingdom), specialist of Gibraltar and foreign offices in Morocco.
- Charles Stewart-Wilson (1864–1950, United Kingdom), specialist of India, Director-General of Indian Posts and Telegraphs.
- Anthony de Worms (1869–1938, United Kingdom), specialist of Ceylon.

Finally, before the day of the first signing ceremony on 6 May 1921, King George V was the first to sign the upper part of the Roll ("George R.I."). He was invited to do so because, when Duke of York, he was President of the Royal Philatelic Society London from 1896 to 1910, and was still a collector and philatelist with the help of the late John Alexander Tilleard and Edward Denny Bacon.

=== 1920s ===
- Ricardo D'Elicabe (1922)
- Bertram McGowan (1922)
- Herbert Oldfield (1922)
- Nils Strandell (1922)
- Henry Luke White (1922)
- William J. Cochrane (1923)
- Arthur D. Ferguson (1923)
- Benjamin Goodfellow (1923)
- Maurice Langlois (1923)
- Charles Nissen (1923)
- Lawrence Burd (1924)
- Henry Manus (1924)
- William Rundell (1924)
- Abraham Hatfield (1925)
- George Higlett (1925)
- Edward van Weenen (1925)
- John Henry Chapman (1926)
- Paul de Smeth (1926)
- Ernest Floyd (1927)
- Alfred Lichtenstein (1927)
- Percy de Worms (1928)
- Albert Derrick (1928)
- Louis E. Bradbury (1928)
- Thomas Charlton Henry (1929)

=== 1930s ===
- William Hadlow (1930) Philatelic author and philatelic auctioneer. (1930)
- Herbert Munk (1931)
- James Benjamin Seymour (1931)
- Heinrich Köhler (1932)
- Friedrich C. Krichauff (1932)
- Louis Meinertzhagen (1932)
- Hiram Edmund Deats (1933)
- Frank Jukes Peplow (1933)
- Alexander Joseph Sefi (1933)
- Charles W. Crawford (1934)
- George Ginger (1934)
- Franz Kalckhoff (1934)
- John Morton Evans (1935)
- Jean L. François (1935)
- Frederick Jarrett (1935)
- Alberto Bolaffi (1936)
- Raymond J. Collins (1936)
- Cyril S. Morton (1936)
- Theodore Champion (1937)
- Frederick S. Phillips (1937)
- James R. Purves (1937)
- Samuel Chapman (1938)
- Winifred Penn-Gaskell (1938)
- Guy de Fayolle (1939)
- Denys R. Martin (1939)

=== 1940s ===
- Bernhard Grant (1940)
- Nicholas Waterhouse (1940)
- Herbert C. Adams (1946)
- Lewis Godden (1946)
- James C. Mursell (1946)
- James Alexander Calder (1947)
- Hugh M. Clark (1947)
- André de Cock (1947)
- Adrian E. Hopkins (1947)
- Henri Kastler (1947)
- H. L. Lindquist (1947)
- Eric W. Mann (1947)
- William Milnes Marsden (1947)
- James Starr (1947)
- Theodore Steinway (1947)
- Aimé Brun (1948)
- Samuel Graveson (1948)
- Henry R. Harmer (1948)
- Harvey Pirie (1948)
- William Byam (1949)
- Etienne Corbisier de Meaultsart (1949)
- Robert Heaton-Rhodes (1949)
- José Joaquim Moniz de Aragão (1949)
- John K. Sidebottom (1949)

=== 1950s ===
- Stanley B. Ashbrook (1950) (United States), writer of standard books and many articles on early U.S.A. issues.
- H.W. Bessemer (1950) (United Kingdom), outstanding research on the stamps of France.
- Ibrahim Chaftar Bey (1950) (Egypt) President of the Club Philatélique d'Egypte, student of early Egyptian stamps.
- Walter H.C. Bromfield (1950) (Australia), President of the Philatelic Society of Western Australia for twenty-one years, intensive research on Western Australian stamps.
- Lester George Brookman (1950) (United States), editor for many years of the American Philatelist, writer of books on the 19th-century issues of the U.S.A.
- Pierre Morel d'Arleux (1950) (France), Honorary Secretary of the Académie de Philatélie, chief organizer of the Citex (Paris) Exhibition, writer on the stamps of France.
- R.W.T. Lees-Jones (1950) (United Kingdom), student and writer on Canadian stamps.
- J. Schmidt-Andersen (1950) (Denmark), Father of Danish philately, wrote extensively on the stamps of Denmark, published the plating of all four plates of Denmark No 1.
- Abraham Odfjell (1951)
- Raymond Riesco (1951)
- Malden Studd (1951)
- John Telfer (1951)
- Gerald Wellburn (1951)
- Edward Robert Woodward (1951)
- Gilbert William Collett (1952) Honorary Treasurer of the Philatelic Congress of Great Britain from 1933 to 1952, played a considerable part in the preparation of the Jamaica Philatelic Society's Handbook.
- Adrian Albert Jurgens (1952) Leading specialist of the stamps and postal history of South Africa, founder of the Philatelic Congress of South Africa.
- Andrew Mackenzie-Low(1952) Leading specialist of the stamps of Egypt, formed a very fine collection which was sold eventually to H.M. King Fuad of Egypt.
- Alfred H. Caspary (1953) (US) One of the greatest philatelists in the world, owner of notable collections of classic stamps.
- Georges Fulpius (1953) (Switzerland) Particularly interested in the stamps of Switzerland and Greece, served on juries at international philatelic exhibitions.
- H. R. Holmes (1953) (UK) Editor of the London Philatelist, member of the Royal Philatelic Society Expert Committee, wrote many articles.
- Carlos Trincão (1953) (Portugal) Formed a very fine collections of Portugal and Colonies, won gold medals at international exhibitions, Chairman of the Lisbon Centenary Philatelic Exhibition.
- Gordon Ward (1953) (UK) Wrote frequently in the philatelic press.
- Alexander Argyropoulos (1954)
- Leicester Gilbert-Lodge (1954)
- Harry Osborne (1954) (UK), author of several important philatelic books. Awarded Grand Gold Medal for his Great Britain at London International Exhibition 1950.
- Walter Wolff de Beer (1954)
- Kenneth Macdonald Beaumont (1955)
- Maurice Burrus (1955) Known for his worldwide collection, considered one of the greatest ever formed.
- Guy Crouch (1955)
- Gunnar Hagemann (1955)
- Louise Boyd Dale (1956)
- John Campbell Cartwright (1956)
- Mario Diena (1956)
- Clarence W. Hennan (1956)
- John Ireland (1956)
- A. Tort Nicolau (1956)
- Leon Dubus (1957)
- Max G. Johl (1957)
- Georg Menzinsky (1957)
- Sydney R. Turner (1957)
- Orhan Brandt (1958)
- William Gerrish (1958)
- Alec Kaplan (1958)
- Douglas B. Armstrong (1959)
- Winthrop Smillie Boggs (1959)
- Eduardo Cohen (1959)
- Ernest Hunt (1959)
- Campbell Walter Watts (1959)

=== 1960s ===
- James Alfred Birch (1960)
- John Easton (1960)
- Jan Poulie (1960)
- L. E. Dawson (1961)
- Leo Linder (1961)
- Alan W. Robertson (1961)
- Maurice Blake (1962)
- Pieter Korteweg (1962)
- Reginald Urwick (1962)
- George E. Burghard (1963)
- Vincent Graves Greene (1963)
- Joseph Schatzkés (1963)
- John Robert Boker, Jr. (1964)
- Josua Bühler (1964)
- Svend Grønlund (1964)
- Mohamed Dadkah (1965)
- Ronald A. Lee (1965)
- Cornelius Wendell Wickersham (1965)
- Mirosław Bojanowicz (1966)
- Henry M. Goodkind (1966)
- Charles Jewell (1966)
- Robert Wortley (1966)
- Álvaro Bonilla Lara (1967)
- Pierre Langlois (1967)
- William E. Lea (1967)
- Herbert J. Bloch (1968)
- Francis J. Field (1968)
- Michel Liphschutz (1968)
- Dr. Achille Rivolta (1968)
- Bernard Leslie Barker (1969)
- Hugh M. Campbell (1969)
- Cyril Harmer (1969)
- John Francis Rider (1969)
- William A. Townsend (1969)

=== 1970s ===
- Robert Delapierre (1970)
- Doris M. Green (1970)
- H. D. S. Haverbeck (1970)
- Benjamin Rogers-Tillstone (1970)
- John Henry Gilbert (1971)
- Soichi Ichida (1971)
- Marcel Stanley (1971)
- Jean Winkler (1971)
- Lucien Berthelot (1972)
- Einar Caroe (1972)
- Jules Crustin (1972)
- John Marriott (1972)
- Ilia Braunstein (1973)
- Alfred J. Hubbard (1973)
- Charles F. Rousseau (1973)
- Adriaan A. van der Willigen (1973)
- Dr. Jacques Fromaigeat (1974)
- Patrick C. Pearson (1974)
- Raymond Salles (1974)
- George South (1974)
- A. Ronald Butler (1975)
- Ernest A. Kehr (1975)
- Jules Plancquaert (1975)
- Bengt Zimmerman (1975)
- John Gartner (1976)
- Max Guggenheim (1976)
- Sybil Morgan (1976)
- Karl Kurt Wolter (1976)
- Enzo Diena (1977)
- Donnar Dromberg (1977)
- Derek Palmer (1977)
- Sigurd Ringström (1977)
- Tomas Bjäringer (1978)
- Kenneth J. McNaught (1978)
- Mick Michael (1978)
- Philip Silver (1978)
- George Townsend Turner (1978)
- Hans Hunziker (1979)
- John Henry Levett (1979)
- James J. Matejka Jr. (1979)
- John L. Messenger (1979)

=== 1980s ===
- Stig Andersen (1980)
- Tevfik Kuyas (1980)
- Kenneth Pennycuick (1980)
- Gary Sidney Ryan (1980)
- Arthur Salm (1980)
- Horst Aisslinger (1981)
- Guilio Bolaffi (1981)
- James DeVoss (1981)
- Harold W. Fisher (1981)
- Hermann Branz (1982)
- Bernard A. Hennig (1982)
- Max Hertsch (1983)
- Alan K. Huggins (1983)
- Deoki Jatia (1983)
- Walton Tinsley (1983)
- Anton Jerger (1984)
- Renato Mondolfo (1984)
- Leon Vincent Rapkin (1984)
- Robert Granville Stone (1984)
- Carlrichard Brühl (1985)
- Roberto Rosende (1985)
- Raife Wellsted (1985)
- John A. Fosbery (1986)
- Frederick Sellers (1986)
- Paolo Vollmeier (1986)
- Ray Chapman (1987)
- John O. Griffiths (1987)
- Heinz Jaeger (1987)
- Jacques Stibbe (1987)
- Gerald James Ellott (1988)
- Paul Hilmar Jensen (1988)
- Enrique de Bustamente (1989)
- Prakaipet Indhusophon (1989)
- Roger-Louis Loeuillet (1989)
- Christian Sundman (1989)
- Robert M. Willcocks (1989)

=== 1990s ===
- Giuseppe Barcella (1990)
- Ritchie Bodily (1990)
- Jean-Paul Schroeder (1990)
- Jairo Tamayo (1990)
- Alma Lee (1991)
- Robert P. Odenweller (1991)
- Charles J. Peterson (1991)
- Harry Sutherland, QC (1991)
- Alberto Bolaffi (1992)
- Peter Jaffe (1992)
- Seow Chuan Koh (1992)
- Emil Mewes (1992)
- István Gazda (1993)
- Otto Hornung (1993)
- Hiroyuki Kanai (1993)
- Knud Mohr (1993)
- Mary Ann Owens (1993)
- Diljit Singh Virk (1993)
- Don Juan Santa María Álvarez (1994)
- Wolfgang Hellrigl (1994)
- Borje Wallberg (1994)
- Robert Francon (1995)
- Charles Wyndham Goodwyn (1995)
- Francis Kiddle (1995)
- Frantz-Caspar Moldenhauer (1995)
- Kenneth Rowe (1995)
- Norman Hubbard (1996)
- Yoon-Hong Kahn (1996)
- Tay Peng Hian (1996)
- Claude Delbeke (1997)
- Rolf-Dieter Jaretzky (1997)
- Jane Moubray (1997)
- Juhani Olamo (1997)
- Jean Francois Brun (1998)
- Francisco Lemos da Silveira (1998)
- Teddy Dahinden (1998)
- Franceska Rapkin (1998)
- Antonio Bertolaja (1999)
- Joseph Hackmey (1999)

=== 2000s ===
- Sven Dahlvig (2000)
- Ladislav Dvoracek (2000)
- Michael Madesker (2000)
- Egil Thomassen (2000)
- John C. West (2000)
- Leo De Clercq (2001)
- Fritz Heimbuchler (2001)
- Boonkrong Indhusophon (2001)
- Yoshio Watanabe (2001)
- Salih Kuyas (2002)
- Zbigniew Mikulski (2002)
- James Van der Linden (2002)
- Pichai Buranasombati (2003)
- Alan Drysdall (2003)
- Christopher Harman (2003)
- Gustaf Torsten Johansson (2003)
- Joseph Wolff (2003)
- Kurt Kimmel-Lampart (2004)
- David Springbett (2004)
- Harry von Hofmann (2004)
- Tore Gjelsvik (2005)
- Barrie Jay (2005)
- George Kramer (2005)
- Jean Storch (2005)
- Jussi Tuori (2005)
- Paolo Bianchi (2006)
- Michele Chauvet (2006)
- Bertil Larsson (2006)
- Roger Schnell (2006)
- Paulo Comelli (2007)
- Ulrich Ferchenbauer (2007)
- Peter P. McCann (2007)
- Edward W.B. "Ted" Proud (2008) Specialist of marcophily, postal rates and military posts of the British Empire; President of the International Federation of Stamp Dealers Associations.
- Robin M. Startup (2008) Specialist of the postage stamps and postal history of New Zealand.
- Richard F. Winter (2008). Specialist of the postal history of the Northern Atlantic Ocean, President of the United States Classics Society from 1992 to 1996.
- George E. Barker (2009). Specialist in definitive series of France and of some of its African colonies. Born 1930.
- Geoffrey Neil Kellow (2009) author specialist of Australia and its States, bibliophile, organizer of the some Australian philatelic societies' libraries.
- Barbara R. Mueller (2009) Author and editor of many philatelic publications.
- John Sussex (2009)

=== 2010s ===
- Kees Adema (2010)
- Hugo Goeggel (2010)
- Wolf Hess (2010)
- Giancarlo Morolli (2010)
- Wade E. Saadi (2010)
- Brian Trotter (2010)
- Gavin Fryer (2011) Expert on Madagascar and mail for the blind.
- Koichi Sato (2011) Expert on Tasmania and Hyderabad.
- Raymond Todd (2011) Expert on postal stationery and airmails.
- James Peter Gough (United States) (2012)
- Robin Gwynn (New Zealand) (2012)
- Patrick Maselis (Belgium) (2012)
- Michael Sefi (United Kingdom) (2012)
- Douglas N Muir (2013)
- Dr. Luis de Brito Frazão (2013)
- Renate Springer (2013)
- Anthony B Virvilis (2013)
- Alexander Sergeevich Ilyushin (2013)
- Christopher M.B. King (2014)
- Wolfgang A. Maassen (2014)
- W. Danforth Walker (2014)
- Jørgen Jørgensen (2015)
- James Mazepa (2015)
- Stephen Schumann (2015)
- Frank Walton (2015)
- Roger Brody (2016)
- Lars Engelbrecht (2016)
- Jonas Hällström (2016)
- Stephen Holder (2016)
- Alan Holyoake (2017)
- John Hotchner (2017)
- Colin Tabeart (2017)
- Steven Walske (2017)
- Robert Abensur (2018)
- Gustaf Douglas (2018)
- Cheryl Ganz (2018)
- Geoffrey Lewis (2018)
- Prakob Chirakiti (2019)
- Guy Dutau (2019)
- Hany Salam (2019)
- Alan Warren (2019)

=== 2020s ===
- John H. Barwis (2020)
- James L. Grimwood-Taylor (2020)
- Michael M.Y. Ho (2020)
- Yamil H. Kouri Jr. (2020)
- Charles J. G. Verge (2020)
- Dénes Czirók (2021)
- Seija-Riitta Laakso (2021)
- Jose Ramon Moreno (2021)
- Henrik Mouritsen (2021)
- Randolph Neil (2021)
- Bruno Crevato-Selvaggi (2022)
- Reinaldo Estêvão de Macedo (2022)
- Hugh V. Feldman (2022)
- Malcolm Groom (2022)
- Patricia Stilwell Walker (2022)
- Pradip Jain (2023)
- Patricia A. “Trish” Kaufmann (2023)
- Damian Läge (2023)
- Jesús Sitjà-Prats (2023)
- Turhan Turgut (2023)
- Walter Britz (2024)
- Yu-An Chen (2024)
- John Davies (2024)
- Bernard Jimenez (2024)
- Ivar Sundsbø (2024)

== See also ==
- Distinguished Philatelist Award
- Roll of Distinguished Philatelists of Southern Africa
- List of philatelic awards
