= Patrick Maselis =

Belgian industrialist and philatelist

Patrick V.M.J. Maselis is a Belgian industrialist and philatelist who signed the Roll of Distinguished Philatelists in 2012. He is president of the Club de Monte-Carlo de l'Elite de la Philatélie. He was elected president of the Royal Philatelic Society London for two years from June 2017 in succession to Frank Walton.

== Business career ==
Maselis is a chemist by training, and the managing director of a Belgian cereal manufacturing company.

== Philately ==
Maselis specialises in the philately of Belgium and its former colonies.
