= Charles J. G. Verge =

Canadian philatelist

- Occupation: Philatelist

Charles J. G. Verge is a Canadian philatelist who signed the Roll of Distinguished Philatelists in 2020.

In 2006, he won the Geldert Medal for his article on Jan Gabriel Perold who served as president of the Royal Philatelic Society of Canada from 1928 to 1930.

== Writings ==
Verge published The 1959 St. Lawrence Seaway joint issue and its invert book in 2009 and has written many article for various philatelic publications, such as Scott's Stamp Monthly and the Ottawa Citizen.
