= Fromaigeat =

Fromaigeat is a surname. Notable people with the surname include:

- Marie Fromaigeat, Swiss slalom canoeist
- Jacques Fromaigeat (1913–1988), French philatelist
