= The London Philatelist =

British magazine

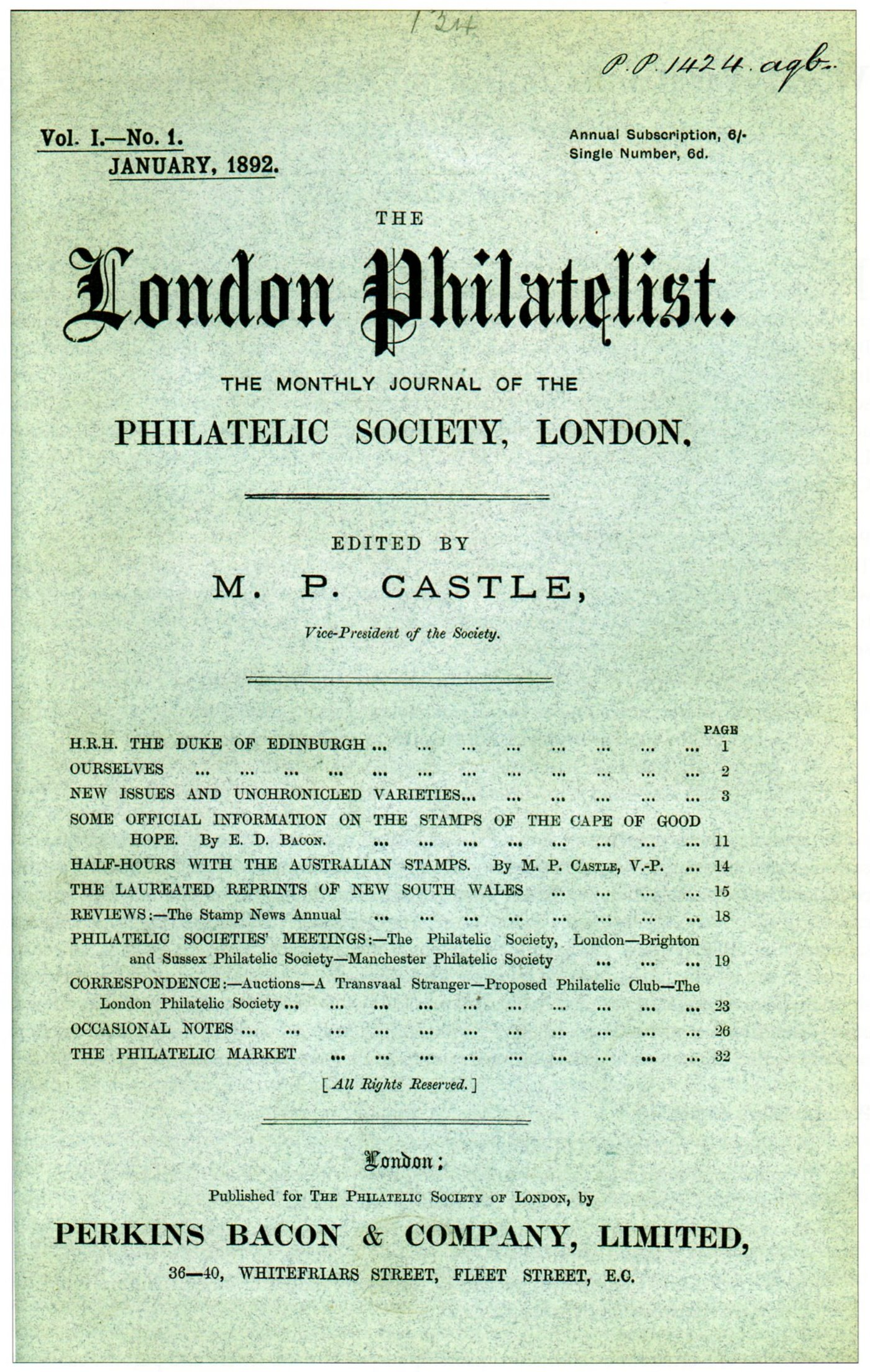
- The front cover of the first number of The London Philatelist, Vol. 1, No. 1, January 1892. Scanned from an illustration in a modern edition of the same magazine.
- Editor: Anthony Bard
- Categories: Philately
- Frequency: Ten times a year
- First issue: 1892
- Company: Royal Philatelic Society London
- Country: United Kingdom
- Language: British English
- Website: www.rpsl.org.uk/The_London_Philatelist

The London Philatelist was first published in January 1892 and is the magazine of the Royal Philatelic Society London.

== History ==
From its beginning until 1943 it was published monthly. Since 1991 it has been published ten times annually. An article about its history in the December 2014 issue (the 1303rd) contains a chart with the date and whole number of all its issues. Its contents include coverage of worldwide philatelic and postal history topics. A substantial part of the magazine is composed of original work, usually by members who may have given a display on their topic at the society meetings.

== Archive ==
The London Philatelist from 1892 to the 2010s is available as a set of searchable DVDs which give access to images of the original articles and illustrations.

== Editors ==
- Jan 1892 - Feb 1917 M.P. Castle
- Apr 1917 - May 1937 Thomas Hall
- Jul 1937 - Jan 1940 Col. Henry Wood
- Feb 1940 - Jun 1946 Rev. Alwin Corder Larmour
- Jul 1946 - Dec 1954 H.R. Holmes
- Jan 1955 - Dec 1974 Arnold Strange
- Jan 1975 - Dec 1982 Stuart Rossiter
- May 1983 - Jun 2001 George E. Barker
- Jul 2001 - Dec 2014 Frank Walton
- Jan 2015 - Jun 2017 Steve Jarvis
- Jul 2017 - Dec 2019 Seija-Riitta Laakso
- Jan 2020 - Anthony Bard
