= Heinrich Köhler (philatelist) =

German philatelist

Heinrich Köhler (24 March 1881 – 22 August 1945) was a German philatelist who signed the Roll of Distinguished Philatelists in 1932. He was a stamp dealer and philatelic publisher. From 1904 until 1912 he ran and was the co-founder of Gilbert & Köhler, Paris. He is best known as the founder of the German auction house of the same name. This philatelic auction house was started 1913 in Berlin and still exists.

== References and sources ==
Sources

- Heinrich Köhler und seine Nachfolger (Heinrich Köhler and His successors) by Wolfgang Maassen, Schwalmtal, Germany: Phil Creativ GmbH, 2013, 492 pages
