= Michael Madesker =

Canadian philatelist

Michael Madesker FRPSL was a Canadian philatelist who was appointed to the Roll of Distinguished Philatelists in 2000. He is a fellow of the Royal Philatelic Society of London. He obtained the Geldert and Dube Medals for his philatelic writing and was president of the Royal Philatelic Society of Canada. In 2010 he received the Philatelic Achievement Award of the Smithsonian Museum. He made a donation of his philatelic medals to the Vincent Graves Greene Philatelic Research Foundation.
