= Sundman =

Sundman is a surname. Notable people with the surname include:

- Christian Sundman (1933–1994), Finnish philatelist
- Danne Sundman (1973–2018), politician from Åland
- Gunnar Sundman (1893–1946), Swedish swimmer
- Jimmy Sundman (born 1989), Finnish footballer
- Joonas Sundman (born 1998), Finnish footballer
- Karl F. Sundman (1873–1949), Finnish mathematician
- Maynard Sundman (1915–2007), founder of Littleton Coin Company
- Mikael Sundman (born 1947), Finnish architect
- Per Olof Sundman (1922–1992), Swedish writer and politician
- Willhelm Sundman (born 1992), Swedish politician
