= Postal orders of Cyprus =

Postal orders have been issued by Cyprus at various times. Information about them is not easily available.

== Cypriot Local Inland Postal Orders ==
These have been reported, but cannot yet be confirmed.

== Cypriot-issued British Postal Orders ==
It is not yet known when these began to be issued, but they were overprinted and issued as late as the 1970s.

== BFPO-issued Postal Orders ==
These have been confirmed as having been issued at BFPO 567, Nicosia, Cyprus, which has since closed down. A 50 Pence postal order bearing the datestamp 'UN NICOSIA BFPO 567' with the date '04. AP 05' is in a private collection in New Zealand. This unusual date stamp reflects that this particular BFPO was designated as an official United Nations field post office. The BFPO issues are very sought after by collectors, as the location of the BFPOs is usually a closely guarded secret in the British Armed Forces for security reasons.
