= Frantz-Caspar Moldenhauer =

Norwegian philatelist

Frantz-Caspar Moldenhauer Jr. (19 April 1920 to 8 September 1999) was a Norwegian philatelist who in 1995 was invited to sign the Roll of Distinguished Philatelists. Moldenhauer has been described as the greatest authority on the stamps of Norway. His display of Norwegian stamps 1845-80 won a Grand Prix award at Norwex 80. He has also formed award-winning collections of the Danish West Indies. He is a founder member of the Postal History Society of Norway, and a fellow of the Society of Postal Historians in the United Kingdom.

== Selected publications ==
- The maritime history of Norwegian steamships. 1971.
