= Jules Crustin =

Belgian philatelist

Jules E.H.P.J. Crustin (14 May 1905 – 1987) was a Belgian philatelist who was added to the Roll of Distinguished Philatelists in 1972. He was a specialist in the philately of Luxembourg.

== Selected publications ==
- La Garnison Prussienne dans la Forteresse de Luxembourg et son service postal 1816-67
