= Ricardo D. Eliçabe =

Argentine physician and philatelist (1887–1968)

Ricardo D. Eliçabe FRPSL
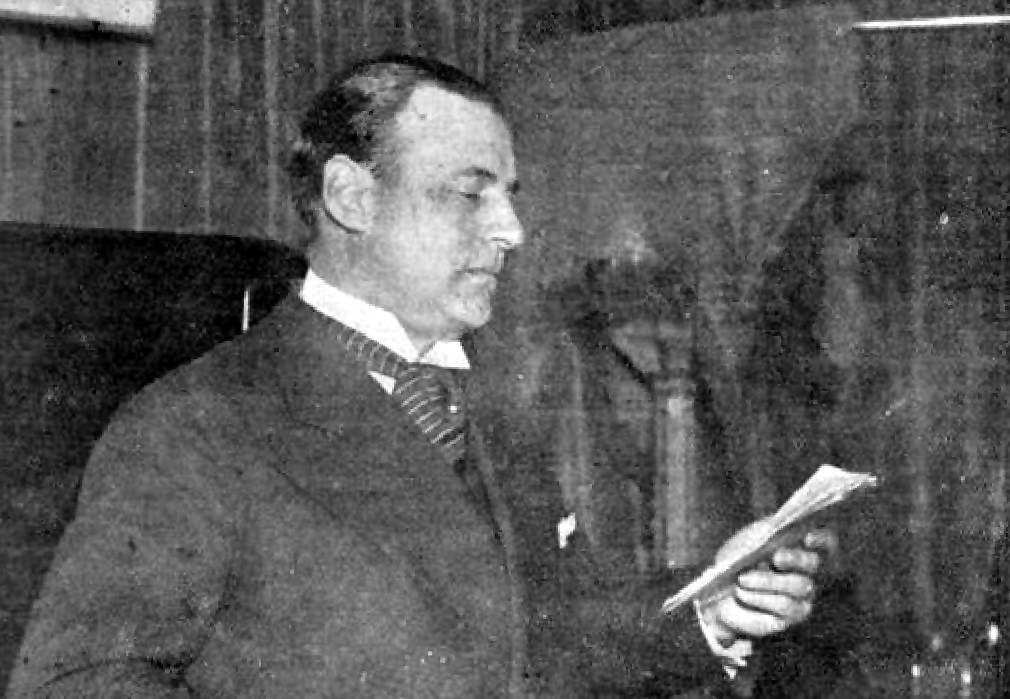
- Born: 25 August 1887; Bahía Blanca, Argentina
- Died: 12 June 1968 (aged 80); Mar del Plata, Argentina
- Education: University of Buenos Aires
- Occupations: Physician; Petroleum industry executive Philatelist
- Known for: Co-founding "La Isaura" refinery in Bahía Blanca; Collections and writings on South American stamps
- Parent(s): Jean Eliçabe Aguer; Josefa Echave

Ricardo Daniel Eliçabe Echave FRPSL (25 August 1887 – 12 June 1968) was an Argentine physician who had a career in the petroleum industry. In 1925, he co-founded the Refinería de Petróleo "La Isaura" S.A. in Bahía Blanca, a company of which he was later president. The Dr. Ricardo Eliçabe Refinery in Bahía Blanca is named for him.

He was also a noted philatelist who edited the journal of the Sociedad Filatélica Argentina, wrote a 28-part catalogue of the stamps of Uruguay, and published a series of monographs on aspects of South American stamps. He was added to the Roll of Distinguished Philatelists in 1922 and was elected a fellow of the Royal Philatelic Society London in 1937.

== Early life ==
Ricardo Eliçabe was born in 1887. He qualified as a physician in 1912 at the University of Buenos Aires with a thesis on Addison's disease.

== Career ==
Eliçabe was a co-founder in 1925, and later president, of the Refinería de Petróleo "La Isaura" S.A. in Bahía Blanca, Buenos Aires Province.

== Philately ==
Eliçabe specialised in South American philately. He published a catalogue of Uruguay stamps in 28 parts in the Revista de la Sociedad Filatélica Argentina between 1917 and 1944 and also wrote a series of monographs on various aspects of the stamps of South America, such as his study of the first issue of Bolivia and its forgeries. He also built a collection of the stamps of the Argentine province of Corrientes. He was added to the Roll of Distinguished Philatelists in 1922.

He took an active part in organised philately and was a member of the Sociedad Filatélica Argentina and edited and contributed to their journal, the Revista de la Sociedad Filatélica Argentina. He was elected to the Royal Philatelic Society London in 1933 and became a fellow in 1937. He was their special representative for Argentina. He served on the juries of philatelic exhibitions such as the International Stamp Exhibition in Buenos Aires in 1951, where he was president, and on the juries of Reinatex in Monte Carlo in 1952, and of the London International Stamp Exhibition 1960.

He was president of the Museo Postal Argentino.

== Death and legacy ==
Eliçabe died in 1968. A philatelic prize, the Premio Eliçabe (Eliçabe Prize), was established in his name in Argentina. His collection of Corrientes stamps was sold at auction by Stanley Gibbons in London in 1973. The Dr. Ricardo Eliçabe Refinery in Bahía Blanca is named for him.

== Selected publications ==
=== Articles ===
- "Catálogo de los Sellos Postales de la República Oriental del Uruguay", Revista de la Sociedad Filatélica Argentina, Nos. 179-334/35 (28 parts).
- "Las primeras emisiones de Paraguay", Revista de la Sociedad Filatélica Argentina, No. 297 (Nov–Dec 1937).

=== Books ===
- Contribución al estudio de los sellos postales Argentinos: El 2 centavos efigie de Don Vicente López y Planes emitido en al año 1877. Ricardo Eliçabe, Buenos Aires, 1938.
- Contribución al estudio de los sellos postales Argentinos: El 4 centavos efigie de Don Mariano Moreno emitido en al año 1873. Ricardo Eliçabe, Buenos Aires, 1938.
- Contribución al estudio de los sellos postales Argentinos: El 80 centavos efigie de Don Bernardino Rivadavia emitido en al año 1877. Ricardo Eliçabe, Buenos Aires, 1939.
- Contribución al estudio de los sellos postales Uruguayos: Variedades en los sellos grabados en acero. Ricardo Eliçabe, Buenos Aires, 1945.
- Contribución al estudio de los sellos postales de Bolivia: El 50 centavos tipo "aguila" emitido en el ano 1867 y sus falsificaciones. Ricardo Eliçabe, Buenos Aires, 1947.
