= Bengt Zimmerman =

Finnish philatelist

Bengt Einar Zimmerman (26 September 1905 – 12 November 1976) was a Finnish philatelist who was added to the Roll of Distinguished Philatelists in 1975.
