= Guy Crouch =

British philatelist

Guy Crouch

Colonel Guy Robert Crouch (1890 – 1956) was a British philatelist who was added to the Roll of Distinguished Philatelists in 1955.
