= William E. Lea =

British philatelist

William Edward Lea (25 May 1907 – 31 January 1970) of Manchester was a British philatelist who was added to the Roll of Distinguished Philatelists in 1967.

In 1956 he won a gold medal with diamond at Fipex, New York, for his display of the stamps of Great Britain.
