= Teddy Dahinden =

Swiss philatelist

Teddy Dahinden

Theodor "Teddy" Dahinden (6 January 1926 – 12 September 2015) was a Swiss philatelist who was appointed to the Roll of Distinguished Philatelists in 1998. He was an astrophilatelist and topical philatelist, receiving several gold medals for his collections prepared jointly with his wife Henrike. He was a former president and chairman of the Swiss Philatelic Federation, having been appointed president in 1976.
