= Seow Chuan Koh =

Singaporean philatelist

Seow Chuan Koh is a Singaporean philatelist who was added to the Roll of Distinguished Philatelists in 1992.

Koh has formed gold medal-winning collections of classic India, Jaipur State, Perak, and Japanese handstamps on the stamps of the Straits Settlements.
