= Harry L. Hayman =

British philatelist

Harry Lewis Hayman (1850–1927) was a British philatelist who signed the Roll of Distinguished Philatelists in 1921.

Hayman was a specialist in Aerophilately, for which he won a medal at the 1923 London International Stamp Exhibition. He also collected to medal level Belgian Congo, China, Hungary, Liberia, Mauritius, and Spain. His general collection was sold for £4000 in 1898. Hayman was the joint founder of Aero Philatelic Society and President of the Hertfordshire Philatelic Society. He was awarded the Order of the Crown of Belgium in 1912.
