= Leo Linder =

Finnish philatelist

Leo Linder (16 August 1910 – 20 June 1974) was a Finnish philatelist who was added to the Roll of Distinguished Philatelists in 1961.
