= Victor Suppantschitsch =

Austrian lawyer and philatelist (1838–1919)

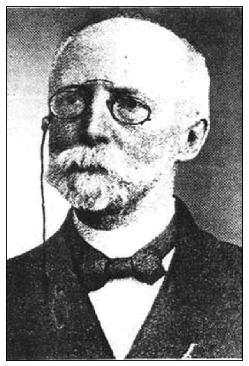
- Born: 31 October 1838; Ljubljana, Austrian Empire
- Died: 2 March 1919 (aged 80); Graz, Austria

Victor Suppantschitsch (31 October 1838 – 2 March 1919) was an Austrian lawyer and philatelist. He retired in 1906 as president of the Senate of the Supreme Court of Cassation. In 2021 he was retrospectively named as one of the fathers of philately.

== Selected publications ==
- Leitfaden der Philatelie, Leipzig, Ed. Wartig's Verlag, 1880.
- Bibliographie, zugleich Nachschlagebuch der gesamten deutschen philatelistischen Literatur seit ihrem Entstehen bis Ende 1891, Verlag A. Larisch, 1892.
- Grundzüge der Briefmarkenkunde und des Briefmarkensammelns, 1895.
- Die Entstehung und Entwicklung der philatelistischen Literatur in der zweiten Hälfte des XIX. Jahrhunderts, Selbstverlag Wien, 1901.
