= Andrew Mackenzie-Low =

British philatelist

- Born: Andrew Stuart Mackenzie-Low; 1878
- Died: 1962 (aged 83–84)
- Occupation: philatelist

Andrew Stuart Mackenzie-Low (1878 – 1962) was a British philatelist who signed the Roll of Distinguished Philatelists in 1952.

== Publications ==
- Notes on Postage Stamps of Egypt 1866-72.
