= Stig Andersen (philatelist) =

Danish philatelist

Stig Andersen (1914 - 28 August 1991) was a Danish philatelist who signed the Roll of Distinguished Philatelists in 1980.
