= Leo De Clercq =

Belgian philatelist

Leo De Clercq FRPSL is a Belgian philatelist and postal historian who was appointed to the Roll of Distinguished Philatelists in 2001. He has received the Paul de Smeth Medal (1975), the Costerus Medal (1988) and the SAVO Plakette (1993). He is a fellow of the Royal Philatelic Society London.
