= James Van der Linden =

Belgian postal historian

James Van der Linden (born 1930) is a Belgian postal historian who was appointed to the Roll of Distinguished Philatelists in 2002. He specialises in the postal history of Belgium and its colonies. In 1995 he received the Crawford Medal of the Royal Philatelic Society London for his book Catalogue des marques de passage.

== Selected publications ==
- Catalogue des marques de passage
