= Max Guggenheim =

Swiss philatelist (1922–1996)

Max Guggenheim (6 November 1922 – 10 March 1996) was a Swiss philatelist who was added to the Roll of Distinguished Philatelists in 1976.

Guggenheim was an expert in the philately of Great Britain, of which he formed an international Large Gold medal-winning collection, Nova Scotia, and the postal history of Texas.
