= Egil Thomassen =

Norwegian aerophilatelist

Egil H. Thomassen FRPSL (born 1935) is a Norwegian architect and aerophilatelist who was appointed to the Roll of Distinguished Philatelists in 2000. His collections have earned Large Gold medals at PACIFIC 97 and ISRAEL 98. He has been president of the Federation of Norwegian Philatelists.

== Selected publications ==
- Norwegian Air Mail Handbook
- Guidelines for Aerophilately
