= Alan Holyoake =

British businessman and philatelist (born 1945)

Alan Manfred Holyoake (born December 1945) is a British businessman and philatelist who is a specialist in the stamps and postal history of Great Britain and a fellow of the Royal Philatelic Society London.

Holyoake "made his fortune in the fish business" and first invested in stamps when he read a May 2001 The Daily Telegraph article about Queen Elizabeth II selling part of her stamp collection, which he subsequently bought. In 2016, the Sunday Telegraph described him as "one of the world's most successful stamp collectors".

Holyoake was awarded the Grand Prix for the best exhibit at the London 2010 International Stamp Exhibition for his display of The First Line Engraved Postage Stamps. In 2017 he was appointed to the Roll of Distinguished Philatelists.

In December 2021, a stamp owned by Holyoake, described as the first Penny Black, attached to a piece of card known as the "Wallace document", was offered for sale through action by Sotheby's. However, it failed to sell. Holyoake had bought the document a decade earlier for less than £50,000, when it was rumoured that the stamp was one of the first Penny Blacks to have been printed. In the intervening period, the Royal Philatelic Society and the British Philatelic Association had certified the stamp, significantly raising its value.

== Selected publications ==
- Great Britain: the development and use of the first issues. Collectors Club of New York, 2009. OCLC No. 785955712
- Great Britain secured delivery of mail 1450-1862. The Great Britain Philatelic Society, 2012.
