= Karl Kurt Wolter =

German philatelist

Dr. Karl Kurt Wolter (23 March 1905 – 7 December 1988) was a German philatelist who was added to the Roll of Distinguished Philatelists in 1976.
