= Yoon-Hong Kahn =

Yoon-Hong Kahn FRPSL is a Korean philatelist who was appointed to the Roll of Distinguished Philatelists in 1996, the first Korean to be so honoured. He is also the first to receive a gold medal at an international stamp exhibition for a display of Korean material. He is a fellow of the Royal Philatelic Society London. Kahn is a specialist in the philately of Korea, Japan and China.
