= Peter Jaffé =

Australian philatelist

Peter Jaffé OAM (19 April 1914 – 14 August 2005) was an Australian philatelist who was added to the Roll of Distinguished Philatelists in 1992.

Jaffé was educated at Rugby School and King's College, Cambridge.
