= John A. Fosbery =

British philatelist

John Abdy Lyons Fosbery (2 October 1909 – 9 January 2005) was a British philatelist who was added to the Roll of Distinguished Philatelists in 1986.

Fosbery was a specialist in the philately of South America and founded the Spanish Main Philatelic Society.

Fosbery served in the British Army during the Second World War rising to the rank of Major.
