= Leicester Gilbert-Lodge =

British philatelist

Leicester James Gilbert-Lodge (25 August 1882 – 12 July 1966) was a British philatelist who was added to the Roll of Distinguished Philatelists in 1954.

Gilbert-Lodge was brought up at Cheltenham and around the turn of the century prospected for gold in Western Australia. Later he lived in Chile. He had his own firm of builders and decorators in Kensington and during the First World War he held appointments as Town Major in France with the rank of captain.

Gilbert-Lodge joined the Royal Philatelic Society London in 1922 and from 1926 to 1961 was Honorary Secretary.
