= Antonio Bertolaja =

Italian philatelist

Antonio Bertolaja FRPSL was an Italian philatelist who was appointed to the Roll of Distinguished Philatelists in 1999. He formed leading collections of the Cape of Good Hope and Newfoundland and was a fellow of the Royal Philatelic Society of London who awarded him their Tilleard Medal.

== Selected publications ==
- My romance with the Cape. David Feldman SA, Switzerland, 2002.
