= Sydney R. Turner =

British philatelist

Sydney Robert Turner (17 November 1880 – 1972) was a British philatelist who was added to the Roll of Distinguished Philatelists in 1957.
