= Robert Abensur =

French philatelist

- Occupation: Philatelist

Robert Abensur is a French philatelist who was appointed to the Roll of Distinguished Philatelists in 2018. He has been president of the Académie de philatélie since 2002. He was made a chevalier of the Ordre des Arts et des Lettres in 2009.
