= Postage stamps and postal history of Norway =

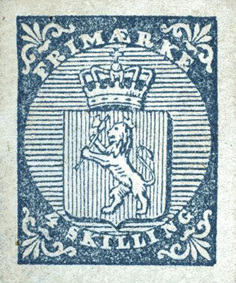
First postage stamp, 1855

The postal system of Norway dates from 1647, when Christian IV of Denmark–Norway granted a concession to a private company who established the Postvesenet (now Posten Norge). The Postvesenet primarily provided a way for various parts of the country to communicate with the central government in Christiania (spelled Kristiania from 1877; renamed Oslo in 1925). Although Norway came under rule of the Swedish king in 1815, the postal service remained independent of the Swedish post, and continued to gradually established routes throughout the country.

== History ==
Christian IV granted the postal concession for Norway to Henrik Morian on 17 January 1647 and Morian became the first Norwegian postmaster, followed by his wife Anna who was postmaster from 1648 to 1653. The first route was by sea from Christiania to Copenhagen. Other sea routes, including the ones to Kristiansand, Stavanger, Bergen, and Trondheim followed. Originally, all mail was consolidated in Christiania before being sent out. The sea routes utilized merchant shipping, but land routes were slower to develop, with the post being passed from farmstead to farmstead. Incentives for postal-route farmers included exemptions from county road work and military service, and in some cases reduction in taxes. The postal routes delivered the mail to the government offices, and there was no local mail delivery, so gradually private local posts grew up in the larger cities and towns.

In 1719, the private concession was terminated and the Danish-Norwegian state took over the national postal service as a state monopoly; however, the local city posts remained private.

The first postal marking were postmarks introduced at Oslo in 1845, an octagonal issued January 1 quickly followed by a circular town/date stamp that same month. These continued to be used by the 49 post offices on envelopes and postal stationery after the introduction of postage stamps.

The first cancellations were grid cancels to coincide with the issue of the first postage stamp in 1855. These were used from January 1855 until January 1856, when they were withdrawn to be re-engraved with 354 different numerals. It was then necessary to use date postmarks to provisionally cancel stamps from February to August 1856. From September 1856, numeral three-ring cancels, one numeral for each post office, were used to cancel stamps, the numbers eventually reaching 383. By 1859, these numeral cancels were replaced by circular town/date cancels.

The first postage stamp was issued January 1855, and depicted the Coat of Arms of Norway. As they were intended for local use, they were printed without "Norge" and in only the 4 Skilling value.

=== Posthorn stamps ===
In 1872, Norway introduced its first stamp with a posthorn design; stamps of this type, with periodic redesigns, have been in use ever since.

P. Petersen, Kristiania Issues (1872–1879):

Series I – Values in SKILLING with NORGE in sans-serif lettering, Posthorn Shaded (1872–1875): 1 Sk Green, 2 Sk Blue, 3 Sk Red, 4 Sk Violet, 6 Sk Orange-Brown, 7 Sk Brown. Two values were overprinted, 15 ØRE over 4 Sk (1908) and 30 ØRE over 7 Sk (1906) from remaining overstocks.

P. Petersen, Kristiania; Chr. Johnsen, Kristiania; and Central Printing Works, Kristiania Issues:

Series II – Values in ØRE with NORGE in sans-serif lettering (1877–1893): 1 to 60 ØRE

i) Posthorn Shaded (appears quite dark) (1877–1878): (Petersen) 1 to 60 ØRE; later two values from 1877 were redrawn as follows: 5 ØRE (Petersen redrawn, small "5" without ball, 1879), 10 ØRE (Johnsen redrawn, large "1" with tip pointing downward, 1882)

ii) Posthorn Unshaded (appears much lighter):

a) 21mm die – Johnsen (1882–1885): 3 to 25 øre.

b) 20mm die – Central (1886–1893): 1 to 25 ØRE.

Central Printing Works, Kristiania; Chr. H. Knudsen Issues:

Series III – Values in ØRE with NORGE in Roman lettering (1893–1929): 1 to 60 ØRE

i) Spot/Circular Line of Color within top ring of Posthorn Under the Crown:

a) Central (1893–1895): 1 to 50 ØRE (Perf. 14.5 x 13.5 or 13.5 x 12.5)

b) Knudsen (1895–1908): 1 to 50 ØRE, plus new values 2, 15, 30, 60 ØRE (Perf. 14.5 x 13.5 or 13.5 x 12.5)

ii) Posthorn re-engraved removing the Spot of Color within top ring of Posthorn Under the Crown. Posthorn much brighter, showing an almost continuous white line from mouthpiece to the bell:

a) Knudsen (1909–1919) (Perf 14.5 x 13.5): 1 to 60 ØRE

b) Knudsen (1920–1929) (Perf 14.5 x 13.5): New values and Colors: 5, 7, 10, 15, 20, 25, 30, 40, 60 ØRE

Emil Moestue A/S Issues (1937–1952) – Screened Rotary Photogravure:

Series IV – Values in ØRE Printed in Photogravure (1937–1952): 1 to 20 ØRE

Note: These are easy to identify since the vertical background lines surrounding the Posthorn and Crown have been removed.

i) Watermarked or Unwatermarked Paper

ii) V Overprint, Watermarked or Unwatermarked Paper (August 1941): 1 to 12 ØRE

Bank of Norway Issues (1962–2001):

Series V – Values in ØRE Steel Engraved (1962): 5 to 20 ØRE

Note: The Steel Engraved issues are easy to identify since they have the following unique characteristics:

a) The tubing of the Posthorn is wider and cleaner

b) The Oval Band with "NORGE" consists of fine horizontal lines

c) The Large Numeral is not a solid color, but has fine regularly spaced white dots

Series VI – Values in ØRE Steel Engraved on Phosphor Paper (1969–1989, 1974, 1978–1994): 5 to 20 ØRE, 25 ØRE, 40 to 90 ØRE

Series VII – Values in ØRE (New Values) Four-color Offset on Coated Paper (1997–2001): 0,10 to 0,50 Kr

Series VIII – Values in KRONER (two-color) Steel Engraved on Phosphor or Coated Paper (1991–2000): 1 to 9 Kr

Crown and Posthorn in "Gold" Color:

Royal Joh. Enschedé, Holland Issues – Offset (from 2001):

Series IX – Values in KRONER, Low Values (multi-color) Five-Color Offset on Coated Paper (from 2001): 1 to 9 Kr

Series X – Values in KRONER, High Values (multi-color) Offset on Coated Paper (from 2010): 10 to 70, and 90 Kr; Miniature Sheet 19 Kr (2022). Some of the latest issues exist with a) either gummed or self-adhesive papers; b) phosphor (up to 1994) or coated (since 1994) papers; c) with two gauges of perforations.

=== Local posts ===
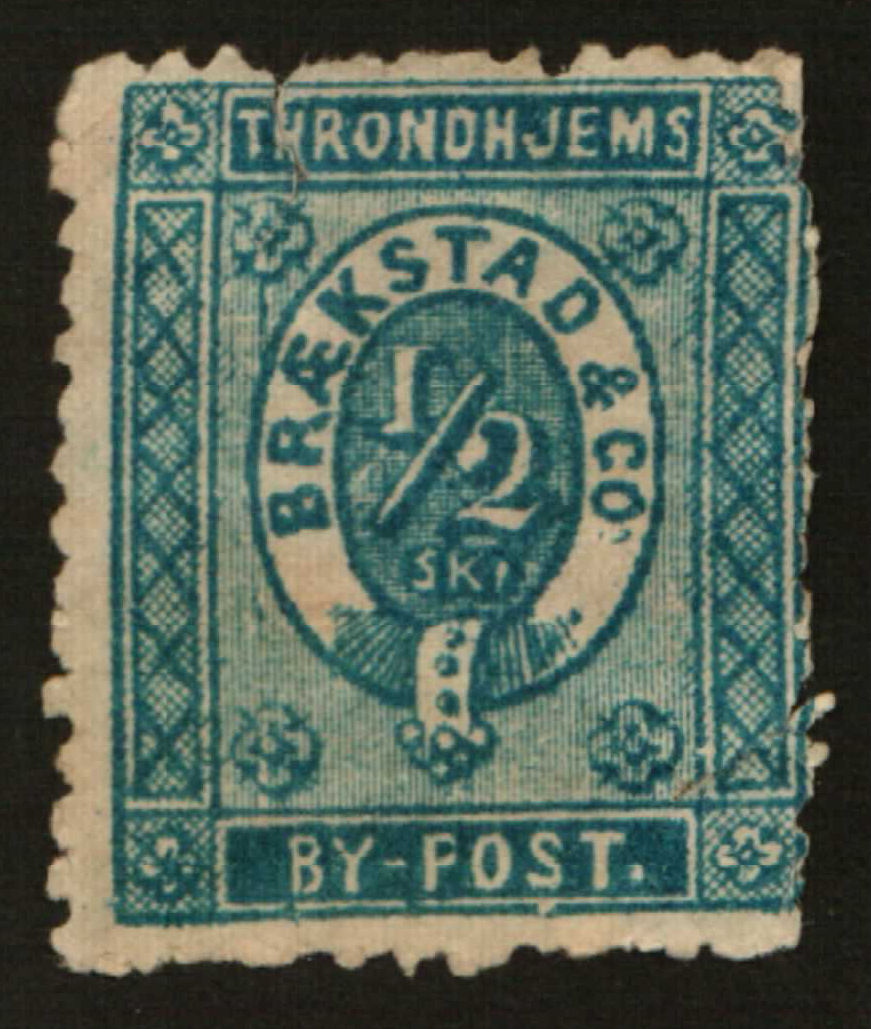
1871 blue ½ skilling from Trondheim local post

Local posts, both formal and informal, originally grew up to distribute the non-official mail brought by the Postvesenet, and soon included messenger services within towns.

In 1888, there were fourteen private local posts in operation in Norway. Following commercial concerns about this patchwork system of mail delivery, the Norwegian government conducted a review of the effectiveness and trustworthiness of local post deliveries. The postmaster asked local governments, where such services operated, for comments, as well as conducting inspections. As a result, most were ordered shutdown immediately, a couple were permitted to remain until the Postvesenet established local deliveries. By the mid 1890s all of the local city posts were gone except for the one in Trondheim, the Trondhjems By-Post. It continued until 1913.

=== Spelling reform ===
In 1918, the government moved to reform Norwegian orthography, most notably giving a Norwegian spelling to foreign loan words. For example, "station" became stasjon, which along with changes in the names of some towns, required changing postmarks. At this time the postvæsen (postal service) became the postvesen.

=== Definitives and Special Issues 1905–1939 ===
After Norway gained independence in 1905, the Norwegian Post Office took immediate steps to reduce inventories of older Skilling issues by issuing Provisional overprints from 1905–1908. To honor the new king, sets of high values from 1 to 5 Kroner were issued for Haakon VII from 1907–1933, based on an official portrait by artist Halfdan Wiberg.

The first Commemorative issue was released 10 May 1914 to honor the 100th anniversary of Norway's Constitution, 17 May 1814. Three values were issued depicting the National Assembly.

=== World War II ===
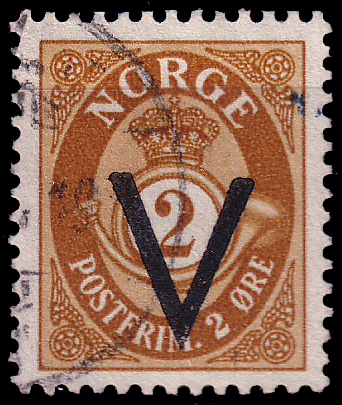
posthorn design overprinted "V" for victory by the German occupation, 1941

When Norway was invaded by Nazi Germany in 1940, a British/French expeditionary force in northern Norway established field post offices that operated until the troops withdrew to England in June 1940. German officials soon took an interest in Norwegian stamps. As early as 30 September 1940, all stamps bearing the King or Queen were banned from postal use. Stocks were sold overseas and the Germans issued a replacement set of Krone values the following month. While the new collaborationist government in Norway issued its own stamps (beginning with the Quisling Issue of 1 February 1942), the government-in-exile, based in London, issued stamps 1 January 1943 for the use of the Royal Norwegian Navy and the merchant marine. These stamps were also used in Jan Mayen island, and, from February 1945, in a Norwegian post office established in Stockholm. A small number of FDCs postmarked Kirkenes 30 April 1945 are known. The London Series was distributed through the post office from 5 to 10 July 1945.

Mail volume increased significantly during the German occupation, as travel was restricted, but also because rural families would send food to their city relatives using parcel post. Postal workers suffered additional dangers during the occupation, as twenty-four postal ships were sunk along the Norwegian coast during the war, and forty-nine postal officials were killed in the course of their duties.

== Sources ==
- Scott catalog
- Oslo Filatelistklubb. "Norgeskatalogen"
- Wellsted, Rossiter, and Flower, The Stamp Atlas (Macdonald, 1986, ISBN 0-8160-1346-2) p. 99
