= Salih Kuyas =

Turkish philatelist

Salih Kuyas is a Turkish philatelist who was appointed to the Roll of Distinguished Philatelists in 2002. He specialises in the postal stationery of the Ottoman region, his collections of which have won large gold medals. In 1991 he won the Tilleard Medal of the Royal Philatelic Society London for his display of Levant postal stationery. In 2002 he won the European Award for Philatelic Merit.
