= Raymond Todd =

Australian philatelist

Raymond Todd is an Australian philatelist who signed the Roll of Distinguished Philatelists in 2011.
