= Campbell Walter Watts =

Campbell Walter Watts (1895–1969) was a New Zealand philatelist who signed the Roll of Distinguished Philatelists in 1959.
