= Bernard Leslie Barker =

British philatelist

- Born: 22 April 1913
- Died: 31 January 1976 (aged 62)
- Occupation: Philatelist

Bernard Leslie Barker (22 April 1913 – 31 January 1976) was a British philatelist who was added to the Roll of Distinguished Philatelists in 1969.

Barker was a specialist in the stamps and postal history of Belgium, a member of the Académie de Philatélie de Belgique, and president of the Lincoln Philatelic Society and the Belgian Study Circle.

Strangely enough, Barker shares the same first and last name as one of the Watergate burglars, Bernard Leon Barker.
