= Ernest Floyd =

British philatelist (1876–1930)

Ernest William Floyd
- Born: 1876
- Died: 1930 (aged 53–54)
- Occupation: Physician
- Medical career
- Profession: Doctor

Dr. Ernest William Floyd (1876 – 15 January 1930) was a British physician and well known stamp collector as well as philatelist, who is known for signing the Roll of Distinguished Philatelists in 1927.

== Philately ==
Floyd was a specialist in the line-engraved stamps of Great Britain, particularly the Penny Black, and also collected British Levant, Confederate States, Bergedorf, Heligoland, Modena, and Barbados. His collection of Penny Blacks was sold to Charles Nissen in anticipation of his service as a physician during World War One but it is unclear if he served. He won a number of medals in international stamp competitions. It was said of Floyd that he had an extremely quick eye in detecting any deviation from type and this was reflected in the important contribution he made to the effort to plate the Penny Black. He was a stalwart of the Manchester Philatelic Society and a member of the Royal Philatelic Society London from 1916.
