= Pichai Buranasombati =

Thai philatelist

Pichai Buranasombati FRPSL (born 1944) is a Thai philatelist who was appointed to the Roll of Distinguished Philatelists in 2003. He is a fellow of the Royal Philatelic Society London and won a Grand Prix National award for his display of Straits Settlements 1624–1867 at the Singapore '95 World Stamp Exhibition.
