= Edward Robert Woodward =

Edward Robert Woodward (1863 – 11 May 1931) was a British barrister who was clerk to the City of London Guardians until 1930. In his spare time he was a noted philatelist who was added to the Roll of Distinguished Philatelists retrospectively in 1951. He was president of the City of London Philatelic Society.
