= Enrique de Bustamente =

Spanish philatelist

Enrique Luis Martin de Bustamente was a Spanish philatelist who was added to the Roll of Distinguished Philatelists in 1989.

Bustamente has won awards for displays at many stamp exhibitions including Brasiliana 93, Capex '96, Pacific '97, and others.
