= Robert Wortley =

British civil engineer and philatelist

Robert Wortley

Robert Kendal Wortley (1891–1968) was a British civil engineer and philatelist who was added to the Roll of Distinguished Philatelists in 1966; he was also the President and a founder member of the Postal History Society.
