= H. R. Holmes =

British philatelist (1895–1989)

Henry Robert Holmes
- Born: 11 May 1895
- Died: 22 January 1989 (aged 93)
- Occupations: Philatelist, philatelic author
- Awards: Lichtenstein Medal (1969)

Henry Robert Holmes (11 May 1895 – 22 January 1989) was the president of the Royal Philatelic Society London 1961–1964 and signed the Roll of Distinguished Philatelists in 1953.

From 1947 Holmes was an Honorary Curator of the philatelic collections at the British Museum, now constituted as the British Library Philatelic Collections. He was an expert on the stamps of Bermuda and Bechuanaland, and a corresponding member of L'Académie de Philatélie. His papers on the postage stamps of Griqualand West 1877 and the provisional issue of the Republic of Honduras were reprinted from The London Philatelist, of which he was also the editor from July 1946 to December 1954.

He won a silver medal at the Jubilee International Exhibition 1912, the Brandt Prize in 1941 and the Lichtenstein Medal in 1969.

== Selected publications ==
- The Postage Stamps of Bermuda. 1932.
- Stamps of the Private Byposts of Norway. 1938.
- The Postage Stamps of Tibet. 1941.
- The Postage Stamps, Postal Stationery, and Postmarks of the Bechuanalands. Royal Philatelic Society London, 1971.
