= André de Cock =

Belgian philatelist

André Emile de Cock (12 July 1880 – 18 July 1964) was a Belgian philatelist who was added to the Roll of Distinguished Philatelists in 1947.
