= Arthur Salm =

American philatelist

Arthur Salm (4 March 1904 – 28 July 1988) was an American philatelist who was added to the Roll of Distinguished Philatelists in 1980. At Muchen 1973 he won the Grand Prix National for his collection of Thurn and Taxis.
