= John Sussex =

British philatelist

- Born: John David Charles Sussex
- Occupation: philatelist

John David Charles Sussex is a British philatelist who signed the Roll of Distinguished Philatelists in 2009.
