= Louis E. Bradbury =

British philatelist (1863–1950)

Louis Edward Bradbury (1863 – 7 July 1950) was a British philatelist who was admitted to the Roll of Distinguished Philatelists in 1929. He specialized in the stamps of the Bahamas and Nevis, and his research on Nevis led to the significant discovery of the original printing plates.
