= Jacques Stibbe =

Belgian philatelist

Dr. Jacques Stibbe (20 June 1920 – 10 May 1999) was a Belgian philatelist who was added to the Roll of Distinguished Philatelists in 1987.

Stibbe was an expert in postal stationery of which he formed one of the largest collections ever formed. He was a president of the Fédération Internationale de Philatélie.

== Selected publications ==
- Les entiers postaux du Congo et du Ruanda-Urundi. Pro-Post, 1986.
