= Robert M. Willcocks =

British philatelist

Robert Martin Willcocks (4 April 1921 – 1 April 1998) was a British philatelist who signed the Roll of Distinguished Philatelists in 1989.

== Publications ==
- England’s Postal History to 1840, 1975, ISBN 0-9502797-1-4
- The Postal History of Great Britain and Ireland, 1972, ISBN 0950279706

With Barry Jay:

- The Postal History of Great Britain and Ireland, 1980
- The British county catalogue of postal history. Vol. 1, 1978, ISBN 0950279722
- The British county catalogue of postal history. Vol. 2, 1981, ISBN 0950279749
- The British county catalogue of postal history. Vol. 3, London, 1983, ISBN 0950279757
- The British county catalogue of postal history. Vol. 4, 1988, ISBN 0950279765
- The British county catalogue of postal history. Vol. 5, 1990, ISBN 0950279773

With W.A. Sedgewick:

- The Spoon Experiment 1853-1858, 1960
