= Guy Dutau =

French philatelist

Guy Dutau FRPSL is a French philatelist who was appointed to the Roll of Distinguished Philatelists in 2019. He is a specialist in the postal history of disinfected mail.

== Selected publications ==
- La vie quotidienne dans les lazarets (2005) (with Michèle Chauvet)
- La désinfection du courrier en France et dans les pays occupés (2017)
