= Prakob Chirakiti =

Thai philatelist

Prakob Chirakiti FRPSL is a Thai philatelist who was appointed to the Roll of Distinguished Philatelists in 2019. He is a specialist in the philately of Thailand and the secretary of the Grand Prix Club. He is the president of the Federation of Inter-Asian Philately executive committee for 2017–2021.
