= Reginald Urwick =

British philatelist

Reginald Henry Urwick (1876 – 25 February 1964) was a British philatelist who was added to the Roll of Distinguished Philatelists in 1962.
