= Sybil Morgan =

British philatelist (1898–1983)

Sybil Morgan, known as Mrs E.L. Morgan, (1898 – 5 April 1983) was a British philatelist who was added to the Roll of Distinguished Philatelists in 1976.

Morgan was a specialist in Welsh postal history, campaign covers to 1914, the cachets of forwarding agents, and Swiss airmails.

== Selected publications ==
- The Postal History of Cardiff. (With Michael Scott-Archer)
