= Jean Winkler =

Swiss philatelist

Jean Winkler (27 March 1894 – 18 September 1973) was a Swiss philatelist who was added to the Roll of Distinguished Philatelists in 1971. One of the first collectors to interest himself in Swiss Prephilately he belonged to the small group of first-generation pioneers in this then very exotic field of collectiong covers without stamps. His first work on the subject, "Les Marques Postales de la Suisse 1695-1850" ("The Postmarks of Switzerland, 1695-1850) played an important role in firmly establishing the rich field of prephilately in the Swiss philatelic landscape. His subsequent revised and extended book "Handbuch der Vorphilatelie" (1968) remains the definitive reference work on Swiss prephilately to this day.
