= Jan Poulie =

Dutch philatelist

Jan Poulie (1907 – 10 December 1981) was a Dutch philatelist who was added to the Roll of Distinguished Philatelists in 1960.
