= Max Hertsch =

Swiss philatelist

Max Hertsch (25 December 1923 – 31 March 2008) was a Swiss philatelist who was added to the Roll of Distinguished Philatelists in 1983.
