= Yoshio Watanabe (philatelist) =

Japanese philatelist (born 1933)

Yoshio Watanabe FRPSL (born 1933) was a Japanese philatelist who was appointed to the Roll of Distinguished Philatelists in 2001. He specialises in the classic stamps of Japan and his exhibits have won the Grand Prix National at PHILANIPPON 81 and the FIAP Grand Prix at SINGPEX 94, as well as gold medals at LONDON 90 and GRANADA 92. He was a fellow of the Royal Philatelic Society London.
