= Alberto Bolaffi =

Italian philatelist

Alberto Bolaffi (15 November 1874 – 26 September 1944) was an Italian philatelist and stamp dealer who in 1936 was added to the Roll of Distinguished Philatelists.

In 1939 he was falsely accused of espionage and jailed for several days. In 1943, to escape the Nazi-fascist persecution, Albert and his wife Victoria, concealed their true identities under false documents showing the surname "Banfi".

Bolaffi appeared on an Italian stamp in 1991 and a French stamp in 2010.
