= Georg Menzinsky =

Swedish philatelist

Georg Menzinsky

Dr. Georg Menzinsky (26 September 1907 – 24 January 1981) was a Swedish philatelist who was added to the Roll of Distinguished Philatelists in 1957. He was chairman of the jury at the STOCKHOLMIA 55 stamp exhibition.
