= Ernest Hunt =

South African philatelist

Ernest Hunt (1877 – 1967) was a South African philatelist who was added to the Roll of Distinguished Philatelists in 1959.
