= Harold William Wescott =

British philatelist

- Born: 1872
- Died: 1923 (aged 50–51)
- Occupation: philatelist

Harold William Wescott (1872 – 1923) was a British philatelist who was appointed to the Roll of Distinguished Philatelists in 1921.
