= Frederick Jarrett =

Canadian philatelist

Frederick Jarrett CM (26 March 1889 – 22 January 1979) was a Canadian philatelist who was added to the Roll of Distinguished Philatelists in 1935. Jarrett was known as the First Dean of Canadian philately.

Jarrett was private secretary to Sir Edward Kemp, minister of Canadian Overseas Military Forces in London during the First World War. He was also once a champion speed typist of Canada.

He was appointed a Member of the Order of Canada in 1973 as "Philatelist of international repute and author of the book on Canadian stamps which is a standard reference throughout the world."

== Selected publications ==
- Stamps of British North America. 1929.
