= Jean-Paul Schroeder =

French philatelist

Jean-Paul Schroeder is a French philatelist who was added to the Roll of Distinguished Philatelists in 1990.

Schroeder has been President of France's Academic de Philatelic, and board member of the Club Philatelique Francais and General Secretary of the French Philatelic Federation.
