= Juan Santa María Álvarez =

Colombian philatelist

- Born: December 15, 1928
- Died: October 28, 2007 (aged 78)
- Occupation: Civil engineer

Juan Santa María Álvarez (Medellín, 15 December 1928 - 28 October 2007) was a Colombian civil engineer and philatelist who signed the Roll of Distinguished Philatelists in 1994. In 1985, the Fédération Internationale de Philatélie awarded him the FIP Medal for Research.

He was professor of mathematics at the Universidad Nacional de Colombia.

== Publications ==
- Historia Postal de Antioquia
