= Colin Tabeart =

British philatelist and philatelic writer

Colin Tabeart is a British philatelist and philatelic writer. He is a specialist in postal routes and rates. He was appointed to the Roll of Distinguished Philatelists in 2017.

== Selected publications ==
- United Kingdom Letter Rates, Inland and Overseas, 1635 to 1900. C. Tabeart, Fareham, 1989. (2nd 2003)
- Robertson Revisited: A Study of the Maritime Postal Markings of the British Isles Based on the Work of Alan W.Robertson. James Bendon, Cyprus, 1997. ISBN 9963579779
- Admiralty Mediterranean Steam Packets 1830 to 1857. James Bendon, Cyprus, 2002. ISBN 9963579868
- Australia New Zealand UK mails to 1880: Rates routes and ships out and home. C. Tabeart, Fareham, 2004. (2nd 2011) ISBN 0954840704
- Australia New Zealand UK mails Vol 2 1881-1900: Rates routes and ships out and home. C. Tabeart, Fareham,
- British West African mail packets to 1900: Rates, routes and ships out and home. West Africa Study Circle, 2015. ISBN 9781905647217
- "British Long Distance Mail Packets 1793-1815" C Tabeart, Fareham
