= Thomas Charlton Henry =

American philatelist

Thomas Charlton Henry (25 March 1887 – 24 January 1936) was an American philatelist who signed the Roll of Distinguished Philatelists in 1929.
