= Gilbert Collett (philatelist) =

- Born: Gilbert William Collett; 1887
- Died: 24 July 1964 (aged 76–77)
- Occupations: Botanist; philatelist

Gilbert William Collett (1887 – 24 July 1964) was a British botanist and philatelist who signed the Roll of Distinguished Philatelists in 1952. He was the founder President of the British West Indies Study Circle.

== Publications ==
- Jamaica - Its Postal History, Postage Stamps, and Postmarks. 1928. (With Rev. C.S. Morton, L.C.C. Nicholson, and W.B. Edwards)
