= Stephen Holder =

British philatelist

- Born: 1939 (age 86–87)
- Occupation: Philatelist

Stephen Holder (born 1939) is a British philatelist who was invited to sign the Roll of Distinguished Philatelists in 2016. Holder is a former dealer in philatelic literature as HH Sales and a specialist in the philately of the Franco-Prussian War and Siege of Paris. He has also formed an award-winning collection of Alsace-Lorraine.
