= Emil Mewes =

German philatelist

Emil Mewes (22 March 1913 – 1 February 2000) was a German philatelist who was added to the Roll of Distinguished Philatelists in 1992.

Mewes formed collections of Bavaria, the Revenue stamps of Alsace, and the first flight covers of Lufthansa. He was Vice-President of the FIP Commission for Literature since 1978 and Editor-in-Chief of Sammlerlupe from 1964 until 1974. Mewes received the Kalckhoff Medal and the Sieger Prize for his contribution to philatelic literature.
