= Jairo Tamayo =

Colombian philatelist

Jairo Londoño Tamayo (1917 – 14 June 2000) was a Colombian philatelist who was added to the Roll of Distinguished Philatelists in 1990.

Tamayo specialised in the philately of Colombia, for his displays of which he won gold medals at Philadelphia 76, Amsterdam 77 and London 1980.

== Selected publications ==
- Fifty Years of Airmail in Colombia. 1969. (with E. Gebauer)
