= Rolf-Dieter Jaretzky =

Rolf-Dieter Jaretzky (born 1935) is a pharmacist and philatelist who signed the Roll of Distinguished Philatelists in 1997.

He was the president of the Grand Prix Club (1994–1996) and the director of the Bundesstelle Ausstellungswesen des BDPh. He is a fellow of the Royal Philatelic Society of London.

He has formed leading collections of the philately of Mexico and Prussia.
