= Ibrahim Chaftar Bey =

Egyptian philatelist (1902–1988)

Ibrahim Chaftar Bey (1902–1988) was an Egyptian philatelist who signed the Roll of Distinguished Philatelists in 1950.

== Works ==
In October 1973, Chaftar's "Finds in Early Egyptian Postmarks" was published in the Journal of The Philatelic Society of Egypt.
