= Jules Plancquaert =

Belgian philatelist

Jules Ghislain Plancquaert (28 December 1903 – 16 April 1983) was a Belgian philatelist who was added to the Roll of Distinguished Philatelists in 1975.
