= Francisco Lemos da Silveira =

Portuguese philatelist (born 1918)

- Born: 1918
- Occupation: Philatelist

Francisco Lemos da Silveira (born 1918, date of death missing) was a Portuguese philatelist who was appointed to the Roll of Distinguished Philatelists in 1998. In 2002 he received the European Award for Philatelic Merit of the Académie Europeenne Philatélie. Silveira is deceased.
