= William J. Cochrane =

British surveyor and philatelist

William James Cochrane (1873 – 15 June 1940) was a British surveyor and philatelist who signed the Roll of Distinguished Philatelists in 1923.
