= Maurice Langlois =

French philatelist (1860-1948)

- Born: 1860
- Died: 1948 (aged 87–88); France
- Occupation: Philatelist

Maurice Langlois (31 January 1860 – 10 June 1948) was a French philatelist who signed the Roll of Distinguished Philatelists in 1923.

== Selected publications ==
- Catalogue des estampilles et marques postales d'Alsace et de Lorraine 1698 a 1870. Yvert & Cie, Amiens, 1937. (With Gerard Gilbert)
