= Henry R. Harmer =

British stamp dealer and collector

Henry Revell Harmer (13 November 1869 – 13 March 1966) was a British auctioneer and philatelist who was added to the Roll of Distinguished Philatelists in 1948.

Harmer was born in London and began collecting stamps as a young boy. He trained to be a chemist, but eventually left for a full-time career as a stamp dealer.

Harmer was the founder of the philatelic auctioneers H.R. Harmer and an expert in the philately of Venezuela.

He remained active with his business, never completely retiring. He died in 1966 and was survived by his widow (who turned 96 the week after his death), four sons and two daughters. After his death, two of his sons, Cyril and Bernard, continued with the firm.
