= Pierre Morel d'Arleux =

French philatelist

Pierre Morel d'Arleux (8 April 1897 – 29 March 1964) was a French philatelist who signed the Roll of Distinguished Philatelists in 1950. He was Honorary Secretary of the Académie de Philatelie and Honorary Secretary of the Société des Amis du Musée Postal.
