= Georges Fulpius =

Swiss philatelist

- Born: 25 March 1886
- Died: 23 September 1955 (aged 69)
- Occupation: Philatelist

Dr. Georges Fulpius (25 March 1886 – 23 September 1955) was a Swiss philatelist who signed the Roll of Distinguished Philatelists in 1953. From ca. 1920 onwards, Fulpius offered his Services as Official Expert, notably for the Durheim Issues (Ortspost, Poste Locale, Rayon I, II, III). Many better pieces of Swiss classic Philately still bear Fulpius' signature.
