= Joseph Wolff (philatelist) =

Luxembourg philatelist

Joseph Wolff is a Luxembourg philatelist who was appointed to the Roll of Distinguished Philatelists in 2003. He is a specialist in the philately of Luxembourg under German occupation and telecommunications on stamps. He has been president of the Fédération Internationale de Philatélie.
