= Étienne Corbisier de Meaultsart =

Belgian philatelist

Major the Chevalier Etienne Corbisier de Meaultsart (19 May 1894 – 19 September 1965) was a Belgian philatelist who was added to the Roll of Distinguished Philatelists in 1949.

Etienne Corbisier was an expert in the philately of Belgium and Bolivia, on which countries he wrote in philatelic journals. He was the special representative of the Royal Philatelic Society London in Belgium.

== Selected publications ==
- Canada: essai sur quelques oblitérations et marques postales. 1947.
- Entiers postaux - Canada - Les deux premières cartes postales. 1947.
- Canada. 1951.
