= Carlos Trincão =

Portuguese philatelist (1903–1968)

Carlos Trincão (30 May 1903 – 1968) was a Portuguese philatelist who signed the Roll of Distinguished Philatelists in 1953.
