= Percy Cooke Bishop =

British journalist and philatelist

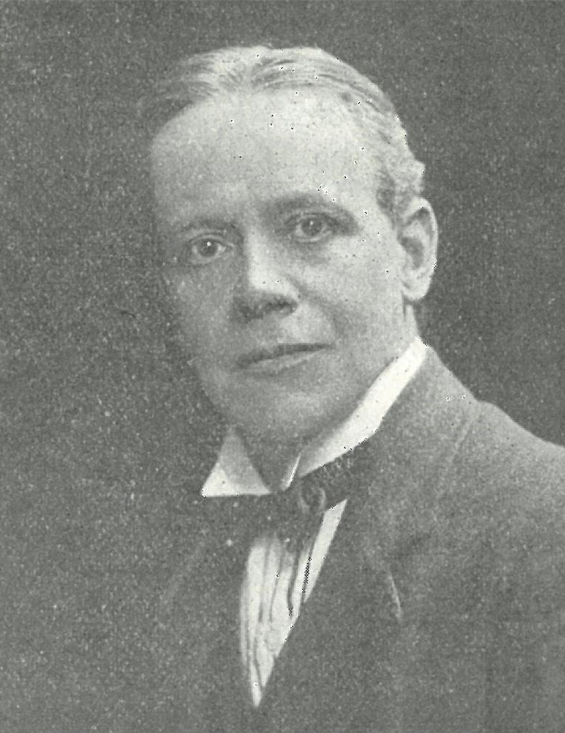
Portrait of Percy Cooke Bishop, 1913

Percy Cooke Bishop (1869 – 1961) was a British journalist and philatelist who proposed what became the Roll of Distinguished Philatelists. He was appointed to the Roll in 1921.
