= Army Postal Service (India) =

Army Postal Service Corps
- Senā ḍāk sevā

Agency overview
- Formed: 1856; 170 years ago
- Type: Military; Postal Service
- Headquarters: Sena Dak Bhawan
- Motto: Hindi : Mel-milāp; English : Reconciliation (Restoration of friendly relations)
- Minister responsible: Rajnath Singh, Defence Minister
- Agency executive: Major General Shipra Sharma, Additional Director General; Army Postal Service
- Parent department: Dept. of Post, Government of India
- Parent agency: Indian Armed Forces
- Website: APS Indian Army

Postal stamps issued in 2006 on 150 Years of the Field Post Office
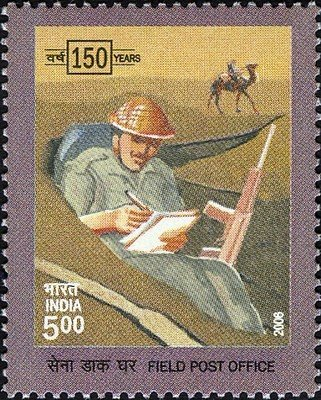
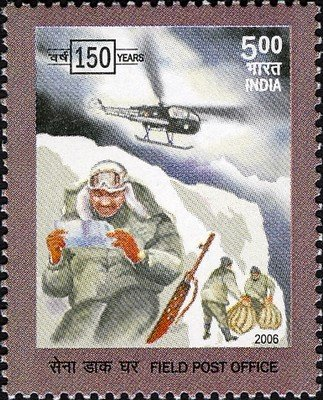
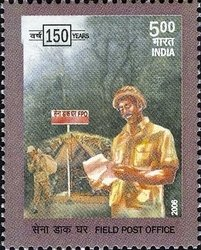

The Army Postal Service Corps (APS) functions as a government-operated military mail system in India. A primary role of Army Postal Service systems is to ensure security form of address in respect of Formations/Units/Troops deployed in Armed Forces and to ensure military mail posted between duty stations at India & Abroad are delivered by adopting security form of address (or vice versa). In some cases, Indian military personnel in a combat zone may post letters to the home country/ home town for free. Officers and men are deputed primarily from the Department of Posts on Field Service. Army Postal Service is the only service that enables civil service officers to work in the Armed forces as combatants.

== Activities ==
Army Postal Service provides Postal facilities, Schedule Despatch Services, Remittance services, Debit Army Post Logistics, Sainik Samachar Patra Seva, Permanent Aadhaar Enrolment Centre facility to Indian Army, Indian Navy, Indian Air Force and Paramilitary forces personnel through 358 Field Post Offices established across the country. It also provides postal cover to Indian troops deployed with United Nations Peace Keeping Forces abroad.

== Organizational set-up ==
The head of Army Postal Service is the Additional Director General, Army Postal Service at Integrated Headquarters of Ministry of Defence (Army) in the rank of Major General He is assisted by Brigadier Army Postal Service at Integrated Headquarters of Ministry of Defence (Army) .

The two Central Base Post Offices at Delhi and Kolkata and Army Postal Service Center at Kamptee, Nagpur are commanded by Commandants in the rank of Colonel. The Postal Officers at Command HQs in the rank of Brigadier / Colonel and Corps HQ in the rank of Lt Col/ Major/Captain monitor the functioning of Field Post Offices (FPOs) under their control and discharge the functions of the Postal Advisor to the General-Officers-Commanding. Two Central Base Post Offices and Mail Halls serve as the nodal points for mail processing. The Central Base Post Offices are 56 and 99 APO operating out of New Delhi (1 CBPO) and Kolkata (2 CBPO), respectively. 99 APO covers all formations in the eight north-eastern states, West Bengal and the Andaman and Nicobar Islands through its network of nearly 96 FPOs. 56 APO covers the rest of the country through its network of 262 FPOs.

== Badge ==
The current badge of the Army Postal Service was approved on 07 Mar 2023. The badge consists of the State Emblem (Ashoka Lions) at the top with words ‘Mail- Milap’, a flying ascending Rajhans encased by a wheat stalk wreath in a semi- oval shape with upward crossed lighting flashes. The wheat stalk signifies growth and prosperity. The ‘Rajhans’ is a mythical bird messenger, representing the function of mail handling by the Corps. The words ‘Mail-Milap’ means ‘union through mail’.

== Head of Army Postal Service ==
List of Heads of APS
Name	From	To
Brigadier DS Virk, AVSM	1 March 1972	10 March 1972
Brigadier OP Raghava, AVSM	13 March 1972	30 December 1978
Major General SK Anand, AVSM	1 January 1979	31 May 1989
Major General SP Chopra, VSM	1 June 1989	31 March 1993
Major General BP Das, AVSM	25 May 1993	1 November 1996
Major General KK Srivastava, VSM	14 December 1996	29 March 2001
Major General RS Kareer	30 March 2001	30 September 2002
Major General SK Sen, VSM	1 October 2002	31 May 2004
Major General V Sadasivam, VSM	1 June 2004	24 February 2010
Major General ARA Sah	18 June 2010	15 September 2011
Major General AK Shori	10 October 2011	31 March 2015
Major General Meena Datta	21 October 2015	21 December 2018
Major General PS Negi	22 December 2018	22 December 2019
Major General DV Mahesh, VSM	24 December 2019	19 January 2022
Major General MK Khan, VSM	17 February 2022	31 January 2025
Major General Shipra Sharma	14 June 2025	present
