= Postage stamps and postal history of Luxembourg =

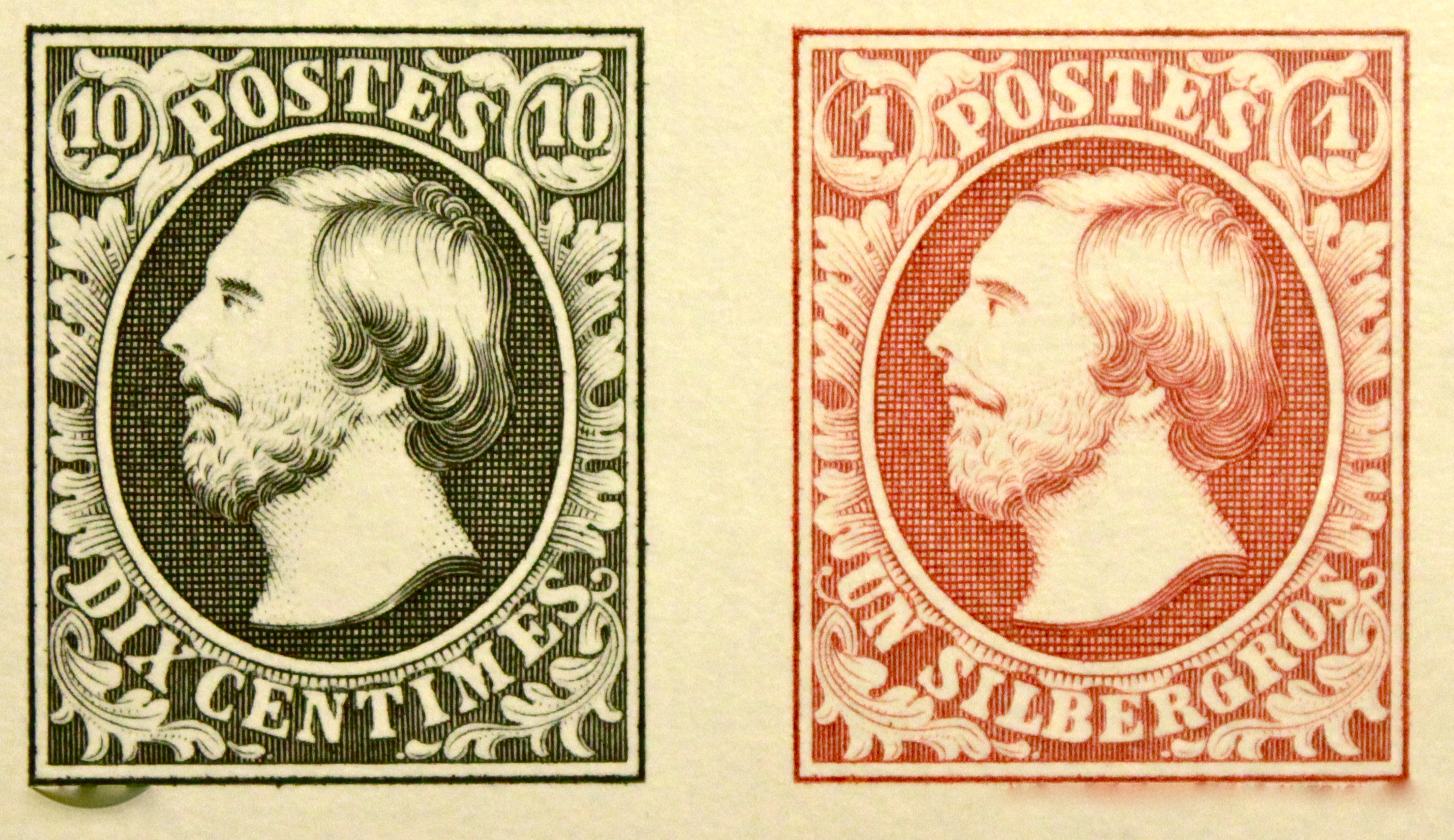
The first stamps of Luxembourg, issued in 1852

This is a survey of the postage stamps and postal history of Luxembourg.

Luxembourg is a landlocked country in western Europe, bordered by Belgium, France, and Germany. Luxembourg has a population of over half a million people in an area of approximately 2,586 square kilometres (999 sq mi).

== First stamps ==
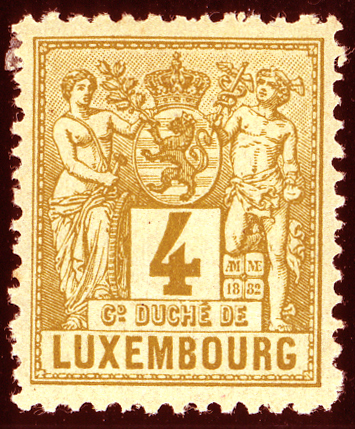
1882 Stamp of Luxembourg

Luxembourg issued its first stamps on 15 September 1852, depicting the portrait of King William III of the Netherlands, also the Grand Duke of Luxembourg. The stamps were issued in both Belgian and Prussian currency but later issues were issued only in Belgian currency. The name of the country was not shown on stamps until 1859.

== World War II ==
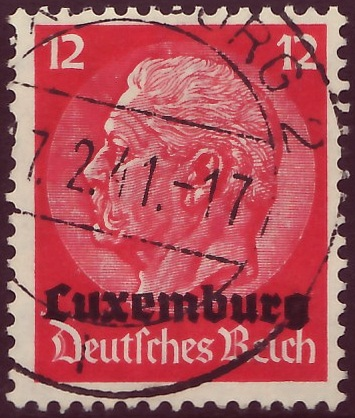
German occupation issue, 1940

After Luxembourg was occupied by German forces during World War II, German stamps were overprinted for use in Luxembourg in 1940 and 1941. In 1942 Luxembourg was annexed into Germany and used German stamps until its liberation in 1944.

== Post-war ==
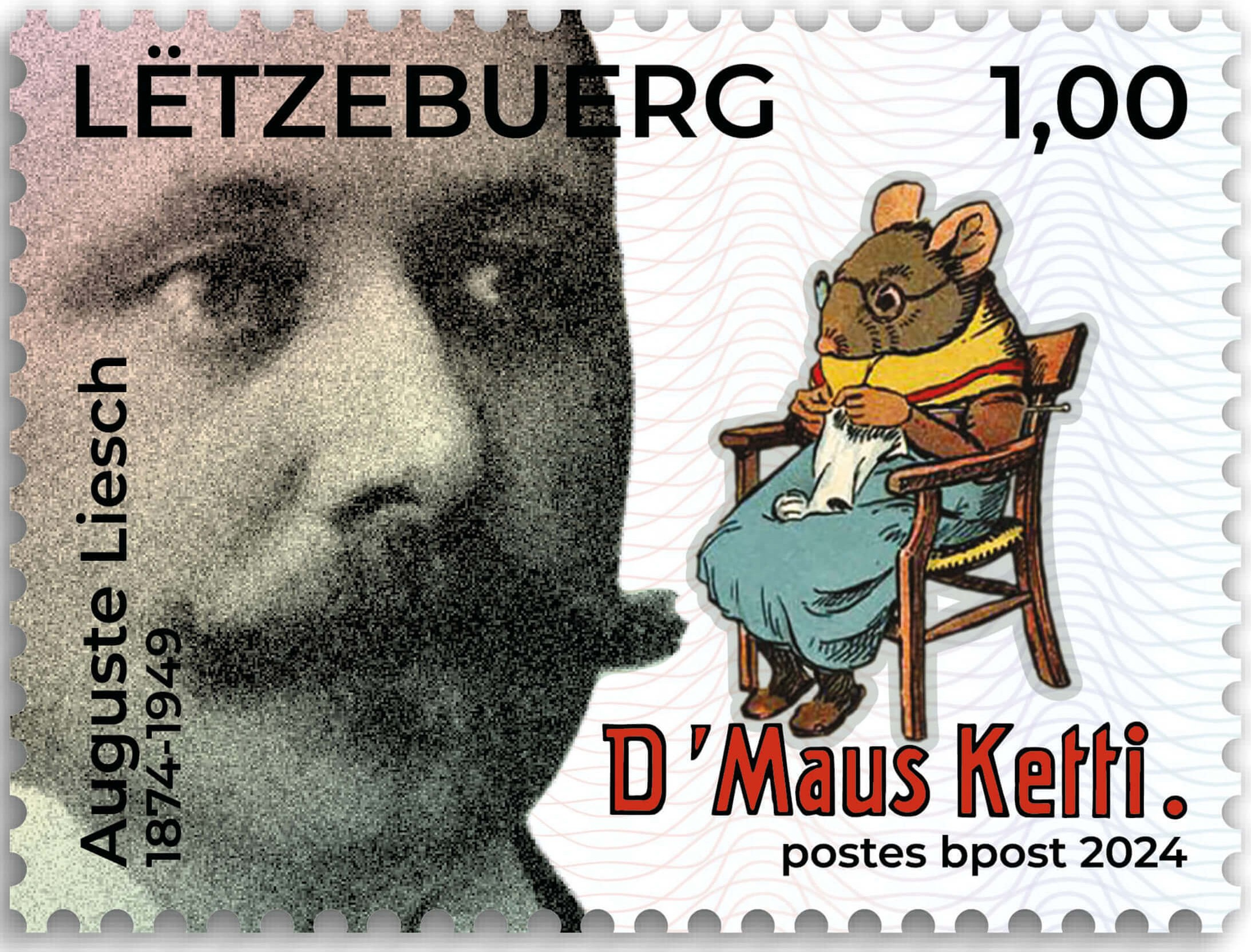

Luxembourg resumed issuing stamps in November 1944. Since 2023 stamps have been inscribed Lëtzebuerg in Luxembourgish.

== Telegraph stamps ==
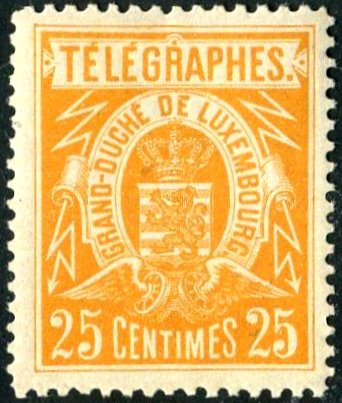
An 1883 25c telegraph stamp of Luxembourg

Telegraph stamps were first issued in Luxembourg in 1873.

== See also ==
- P&TLuxembourg
