= Seija-Riitta Laakso =

Finnish writer and philatelist

Seija-Riitta Laakso is a Finnish writer and philatelist, as well as editor and graphic designer of international philatelic journals and yearbooks. In 2021, she was invited to sign the Roll of Distinguished Philatelists.

== Education ==
Seija-Riitta Laakso is a journalist from the Sanoma School of Journalism who also has an eMBA from the Helsinki School of Economics (Helsingin Kauppakorkeakoulu) and a PhD from the University of Helsinki (2006). Her doctoral thesis Across the Oceans. Development of Overseas Business Information Transmission, 1815-1875 was published by the Finnish Literature Society (SKS) in 2007, and as a Japanese edition in 2014. The book combines maritime history and postal history by studying the routes and speed at which information was transmitted in the nineteenth century, using as examples business correspondence which travelled internationally by sea.

== Career ==
Laakso, originally a historian, worked as a journalist in the Finnish daily newspapers Helsingin Sanomat, Uusi Suomi and Kauppalehti. She was director in the Centre for Finnish Business and Policy Studies (Elinkeinoelämän Valtuuskunta, EVA) and Senior Vice President / Vice President, Corporate Communications, at Valmet Oyj, Silja Line Oyj and Ahlstrom Oyj, from 1991 to 2002. In 2003-2004 she lived in Liverpool, UK, for her doctoral studies. She has written and published several books.

== Philately ==
Laakso was the Secretary General of the Philatelic Federation of Finland from 2005 to 2013. She was the Editor of The London Philatelist, the journal of The Royal Philatelic Society London in 2017-2019, The Posthorn, the journal of the Scandinavian Collectors Club (US) in 2017-2022; and The Congress Book, the yearbook of the American Philatelic Congress (US) in 2020-2023. She is the Editor of Postryttaren, the yearbook of the Friends of the Swedish Post Museum, Svenska Postmusei Vänner since 2020, and Suomen Postimerkkilehti, the magazine of Suomen Filatelistiseura, starting in 2024. As an exhibitor, she has received 40 gold or large gold medals in national and international philatelic exhibitions by the end of 2023.

In 2021, she was invited to sign the Roll of Distinguished Philatelists.

== Selected articles and publications ==
=== Finnish ===
Own publications in Finnish include:

- ”Orjalaivoista Titaniciin – ihminen Lloyd’s Listin haaksirikkouutisissa”. Historiatieteellinen aikakauskirja Lähde Nro 1 2005, Teema: Moraali, pp. 115–131. Labyrintti ry, 2005.
- Postikorttien keräilystä kokoelman rakentamiseen. Helsinki, 2009. ISBN 9789529262250
- Paris 1900 - postikortteja kulta-ajan Pariisista. Helsinki, 2010. ISBN 9789529280704
- Kinoman tyttö. Riga, 2014. ISBN 9789529344840
- Merkillisiä tapahtumia - Collector Events. Riga, 2014. ISBN 9789529347926
- Torilla tavataan - See you at the Square, Riga, 2014. ISBN 9789529334391
- Glamouria Suomessa - amerikkalaistaiteilijoiden suomalaiset postikortit 1910- ja 1920-luvuilla. Helsinki 2020. ISBN 9789529436743

=== English ===
- "Managing the Distance: Business Information Transmission between Britain and Guiana, 1840", International Journal of Maritime History, Vol. 16, No. 2 (December 2004), pp. 221–246.
- “In Search of Information Flows – Postal Historical Methods in Historical Research". Müller & Ojala (ed.): Information Flows. New Approaches in the Historical Study of Business Information, pp. 84–102. SKS, 2007.
- Across the Oceans. Development of Overseas Business Information Transmission 1815-1875. The Finnish Literature Society (SKS), Studia Fennica Historica, 2007. ISBN 9789517469043 The Japanese edition was published in Japan 2014. ISBN 9784862851857
- Collecting & exhibiting picture postcards. Livonia Print, Riga, 2012. ISBN 9789529312900
- "A secret revealed after 110 years - Albert Edelfelt's 'Cabaret de Montmartre, Paris'", The London Philatelist Jan-Feb 2018, pp. 16–30.
- "Glamour in Finland - American Beauties on Finnish Picture Postcards, 1915-1923", The Congress Book 2020, pp. 154-200. American Philatelic Congress, August 2020.

=== Editor / graphic designer of other publications ===
- Nicholas M. Kirke: New York City Foreign Mail Cancellations 1845-1878. 2 volumes. Collectors Club of New York, 2024. ISBN 9780997511901
- Cheryl R. Ganz: U.S. Zeppelin and Airship Mail Flights. USA, 2021. ISBN 9780578909370
- Jon Iversen, Morten Nårstad and Roger P. Quinby: Russia in Finland. The Story of Russian Stamps & Postal Stationery Used in Finland, 1899-1918. Scandinavian Collectors Club (US), 2019. ISBN 9780578473383
