= Jacques Fromaigeat =

French philatelist (1913–1988)

- Born: 1913
- Died: 29 April, 1988 (aged 74–75)
- Occupation: Philatelist

Jacques Fromaigeat (1913 – 29 April 1988) was a French philatelist who signed the Roll of Distinguished Philatelists in 1974.

== Works ==
He contributed to Le Monde des Philatélistes 1969.

- Histoire des timbres-poste de l'Empire in four volumes
