= Frank Walton (philatelist) =

British philatelist

Frank Leslie Walton (2 February 1955 – 1 April 2022) was a British philatelist and a former president of the Royal Philatelic Society London. He was formerly editor of The London Philatelist. Walton was a specialist in the philately of Sierra Leone. He is a signatory to the Roll of Distinguished Philatelists.
