= George E. Barker =

British philatelist

George Ernest Barker (1930 – 16 March 2014) was a British philatelist who in 2009 signed the Roll of Distinguished Philatelists. From 1983 to 2001 he was Editor of The London Philatelist. He was a specialist in the stamps of France and its colonies.

Barker was one of the main organisers of the 56th Philatelic Congress of Great Britain held in 1974 at Enghien-les-Bains, Paris.

== Memberships ==
- Associate member of the Academy of Philately, Paris.
- Member of the Belgian Academy of Philately.
- Founding member of the Académie Européenne de Philatélie.
- Fellow of the Royal Philatelic Society London.

== Awards ==
- Award of Merit, British Philatelic Federation.
- Mérite Philatélique Européen, Académie Européenne de Philatélie.
- Roll of Distinguished Philatelists.
