= Wolfgang Maassen =

German philatelist

Wolfgang A. Maassen is a German philatelist who, in 2014, was invited to sign the Roll of Distinguished Philatelists. He was awarded the Sieger Medal in 2003 and 2008 and the Lindenberg Medal in 2012. Maassen is a specialist in the philately of Brazil and a student of the history of philately and philatelic literature. He is the author of many books on philately, a philatelic journalist and publisher. His own philatelic library, with hundreds of metres of shelf space, is one of the biggest in private hands. Furthermore, he is Editor in Chief of the German magazine philatelie and the international magazine Phila Historica. He is also President of the AIJP, the world association of authors and journalists in philately.
