= Christian Sundman =

Finnish philatelist

Christian Sundman with his Grand Prix International award at STOCKHOLMIA 86.

Christian Carl Sundman (13 January 1933 – 5 April 1994) was a Finnish philatelist who was added to the Roll of Distinguished Philatelists in 1989.

He was president of the Finlandia 88 stamp exhibition and specialised in the stamps and postal stationery of Finland for which he received a Large Gold medal with Special Prize at Wipa 81 and PhilexFrance 82, the Grand Prix International at STOCKHOLMIA 86 and a place in the Court of Honour at Finlandia 88 and Praga 88.

Sundman was president of the Helsingfors Philatelic Society and vice-president 1984/88 of the Finnish Philatelic Federation.
