= Royal Philatelic Society of Canada =

Canadian philatelic organization

- Royal Philatelic Society of Canada logo
- Abbreviation: RPSC
- Formation: 1919
- Type: Organizations based in Canada with royal patronage
- Legal status: Active
- Purpose: Advocate and public voice, educator and network
- Headquarters: Toronto, Ontario, Canada
- Region served: Canada
- Fields: Philately
- Official language: English; French
- Patron: Mary Simon
- President: Dr. Gregg Redner
- Affiliations: Fédération Internationale de Philatélie (F.I.P.); Federation Inter-Americana de Filatelia (F.I.A.F.).
- Website: Official Website

The Royal Philatelic Society of Canada is the premier philatelic organization in Canada. It is a member of the Fédération Internationale de Philatélie (F.I.P.) and the Federation Inter-Americana de Filatelia (F.I.A.F.).

As of June 2026, the Patron of the society is Louise Arbour, the Governor General of Canada.

== History ==
The society was formed in 1919 as the Winnipeg Stamp Society which changed its name to the Canadian Philatelic Association in 1920 and to the Canadian Philatelic Society (CPS) in 1923. The society received permission to adopt the "Royal" title in 1959.

National organised philately in Canada started with the founding of a separate organisation, also called the Canadian Philatelic Association, in 1887. The Philatelic Society of Canada was formed in 1891 and in 1894 the Dominion Philatelic Association was formed. By 1903 all were inactive and no national philatelic organisation existed in Canada until the Winnipeg Stamp Society became the new Canadian Philatelic Association in 1920.

Despite name changes and periods of inactivity on a national scale, many of the same individuals are to be found in the different societies, and the 1925 yearbook of the CPS shows Henry Hechler and Ernest Frederick Würtele to be members, both of whom had been members of the original Canadian Philatelic Association. Alfred F. Lichtenstein was also one of the 285 members in 1925.

== Journal ==
The society's journal, The Canadian Philatelist is published every two months and past issues are available to view on the society web site free of charge together with all the predecessors to the journal.
