= Field post office =

Post office set up for a military unit in the field

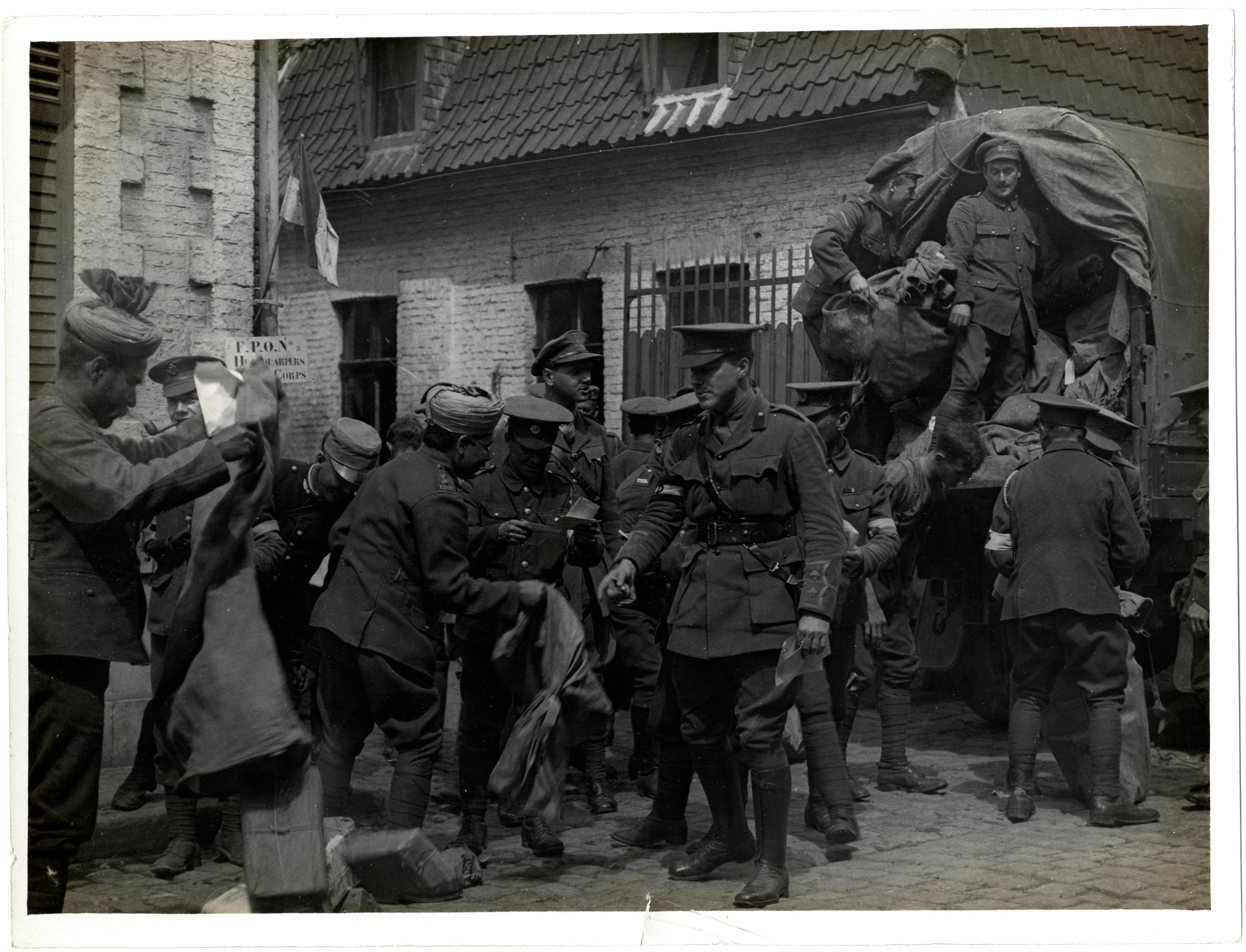
Mail delivery to a field post office in a French town in July 1915

A field post office (FPO) is a post office set up during time of war or when a military unit is on manoeuvres. It is a place to which mail intended for military units in the field is sent to be sorted and forwarded. It is set up "in the field", hence the name, however, FPOs may be on land or at sea. Their use pre-dates the introduction of postage stamps.

== History ==
The first British FPO was in 1808 during the Peninsular War and in 1840 the British Army used a FPO during the first Chinese War.

FPOs were also used extensively during the Crimean War.

Military post offices abroad strive to provide the same services found in their home country. Facilities are often cramped because of the amount of mail they need to handle. Today, military personnel who handle mail must be authorized and trained to do so in accordance with Postal Service and Department of Defense regulations (US). Working in a war zone and screening for hazardous contents in parcels can be dangerous, but the work does help with positive effect the mail has on morale as well as providing a vital service for the military.

== Terminology ==
In the United States a close equivalent is the Army Post Offices (APOs), the Air Force Post Offices (AFPOs) and the Fleet Post Offices (FPOs).

In Hungary the head FPO is known as the tábori főpostahivatal while a normal FPO is an tábori postahivatal.

Equivalent terms are in use in most countries with Field Post Offices.

== Collecting ==
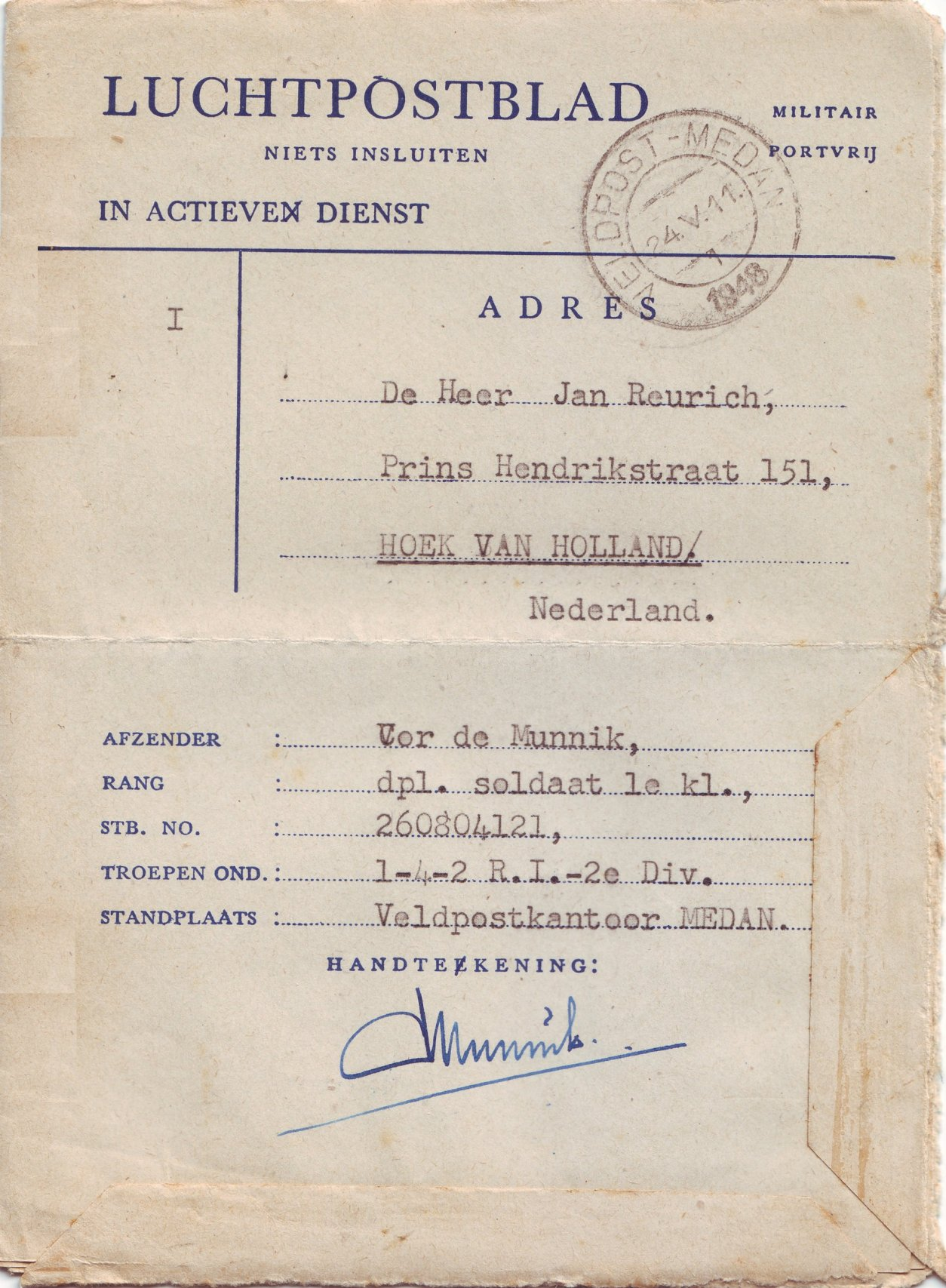
Field post aerogram, sent from Medan, Netherlands in 1948

Field Post Offices have special cancellations and their mail is eagerly collected by philatelists, but the cancellations are sometimes anonymised so that the place of posting is not revealed which presents collectors with a challenge.
