= List of philatelic exhibitions =

This article lists international philatelic exhibitions (unless otherwise stated). (FIP) = Fédération Internationale de Philatélie patronage or recognition

== Africa ==
=== Algeria ===
- Exposition Philatelique Internationale de L'Afrique du Nord, Alger, 3–11 May 1930

=== Egypt ===
- CAIRO'91, Cairo, 7–12 October 1991

=== South Africa ===
- South African International Stamp Exhibition, 1928
- JIPEX '36 International Philatelic Exhibition, Johannesburg, 2–4 November 1936
- South African Tercentenary International Stamp Exhibition
- UNIPEX 1960 International Philatelic Exhibition, Johannesburg, 30 May-4 June 1960
- INTERSTEX '71 International Stamp Exhibition, Cape Town, 22–31 May 1971
- SAPHIL '74 Stamp Exhibition, Pretoria, 7–12 October 1974
- Johannesburg 100 International Philatelic Exhibition, Johannesburg, 6–11 October 1986
- ILSAPEX '98 International Stamp Exhibition, Johannesburg 20–25 October 1998
- JOBURG 2010 (26th Asian International Stamp Exhibition), Johannesburg, 27–31 October 2010 (FIP)
- SOUTH AFRICA 2022, Cape Town, 8–12 November 2022 (FIP)

== Asia ==
=== West ===
==== Armenia ====
- Armenia '90 International Philatelic Exhibition, Yerevan, 27 November – 10 December 1990

==== Cyprus ====
- Cyprus - Europhilex '95, Nicosia, 20–28 October 1995
- Cyprus - Europhilex '02, Nicosia, 22–29 October 2002

==== Israel ====
- Tabil '57 International Stamp Exhibition, Tel Aviv, 17–23 September 1957
- Jerusalem '73 International Stamp Exhibition, Jerusalem, 25 March-2 April 1974 (postponed from 19 to 30 December 1973) (FIP)
- Israphil '85 World Stamp Exhibition, Tel Aviv, 14–22 May 1985 (FIP)
- Israel '98 World Stamp Exhibition, Tel Aviv, 13–21 May 1998 (FIP)
- Israel World Stamp Championship 2008, Tel Aviv, 14–21 May 2008 (FIP)
- World Stamp Championship Israel 2018, Jerusalem, 27–31 May 2018 (FIP)

==== Turkey ====
- İstanbul 63 International stamp exhibition, İstanbul, 7–15 September 1963 (FIP)
- Istanbul '96 World Philatelic Exhibition, Istanbul, 27 September-6 October 1996 (FIP)

==== UAE ====
- DUBAI 2006 (19th Asian International Stamp Exhibition), Dubai, 13–16 November 2006.
- Dubai 2009 International Stamp Exhibition, Dubai, December 2009
- Sharjah 2012 (28th Asian International Stamp Exhibition), Sharjah, 20–25 November 2012.
- Dubai 2026 World Stamp Exhibition, 4-8 February 2026. (FIP)

=== East ===
==== People's Republic of China ====
- China '96 - 9th Asian International Stamp Exhibition, Beijing, 18–24 May 1996
- Shanghai '97 - International Stamp & Coin Exhibition, Shanghai, 1997
- CHINA '99 World Philatelic Exhibition, Beijing, 21–30 August 1999 (FIP)
- China '03 - (16th Asian International Stamp Exhibition), Mianyang city, Sichuan, 20–24 September 2003
- China 2009 International Stamp Exhibition, Luoyang City, Henan, 10–16 April 2009 (FIP)
- Beijing 2009 AEROPEX International Stamp Exhibition, Beijing, 12–16 November 2009
- 27th Asian International Stamp Exhibition, Wuxi, 11–15 November 2011
- China 2016 (33rd Asian International Stamp Exhibition), Guangxi, 2–6 December 2016 (FIP)
- China 2019 International Stamp Exhibition, Wuhan, 11–17 June 2019 (FIP)

===== Hong Kong =====
- HONG KONG 1997 (11th Asian International Stamp Exhibition), Hong Kong, 12–16 February 1997
- HONG KONG 2001 (15th Asian International Stamp Exhibition), Hong Kong, 1–5 February 2001
- Hong Kong 2004 Stamp Expo (17th Asian International Philatelic Exhibition), Hong Kong, 30 January-3 February 2004
- HONG KONG 2009 (23rd Asian International Stamp Exhibition), Hong Kong, 14–17 May 2009
- Hong Kong 2015 (31st Asian International Stamp Exhibition), Hong Kong, 20–23 November 2015

===== Macao =====
- MACAO 2018 (35th Asian International Stamp Exhibition), Macao, 21–24 September 2018
- MACAO 2026 Specialized World Stamp Exhibition, 26 June to 1 July, 2026

==== Japan ====
- Philatokyo '71 International Philatelic Exhibition, Tokyo, 20–30 April 1971
- JAPEX 79 International Stamp Exhibition, Tokyo, 2–4 November 1979 (Local)
- Philatokyo '81 International Stamp Exhibition, Tokyo, 9–18 October 1981 (FIP)
- PHILANIPPON '91 World Stamp Exhibition, Tokyo, 16–24 November 1991 (FIP)
- Philanippon '01 International Stamp Exhibition, Tokyo, 1–7 August 2001 (FIP)
- Japan World Stamp Exhibition 2011, Yokohama, 28 July-2 August 2011 (FIP)
- PHILANIPPON 2021 (37th Asian International Stamp Exhibition), Yokohama, 25–30 August 2021 (FIP)
- JAPEX 2021, Tokyo, 5-7 November 2021 (Local)
- JAPEX 2022, Tokyo, 4-6 November 2022 (Local)
- JAPEX 2023, Tokyo, 3-5 November 2023 (Local)
- JAPEX 2024, Tokyo, 1-3 November 2024 (Local)
- World Stamp Festival Stamp Show 2025, Tokyo, 11-13 April 2025 (Local)

==== Republic of Korea ====
- Phila Korea 1984 World Philatelic Exhibition, Seoul, 22–31 October 1984 (FIP)
- Philkorea 1994 World Stamp Exhibition, Seoul, 16–25 August 1994
- PHILAKOREA 2002, Seoul, 2–11 August 2002 (FIP)
- PHILAKOREA 2009(24th Asian International Stamp Exhibition), Seoul, 30 July-4 August 2009
- PHILAKOREA 2014, Seoul, 7–12 August 2014 (FIP)
- PHILAKOREA 2025, Seoul, 17-21 September 2025

==== Taiwan ====
- ROCPEX '78 International Philatelic Exhibition, Taipei, 20–29 March 1978
- ROCPEX '81 International Philatelic Exhibition, Taipei, 25 October-2 November 1981
- Taipei '93: Asian International Invitation Stamp Exhibition, Taipei, 14–19 August 1993
- TAIPEI 1996 (10th Asian International Stamp Exhibition), Taipei, 21–27 October 1996
- TAIPEI 2005 (18th Asian International Stamp Exhibition), Taipei, 19–24 August 2005
- Taipei 2008 (21st Asian International Stamp Exhibition), Taipei, 7–11 March 2008
- Taipei 2015 (30th Asian International Stamp Exhibition), Taipei, 24–28 April 2015
- Philataipei 2016 World Stamp Championship Exhibition, Taipei 21–26 October 2016 (FIP)
- Taipei 2023 (40th Asian International Stamp Exhibition), Taipei, 11–15 August 2023

=== South ===
==== India ====
- International philatelic & postal exhibition 1954, New Delhi, 1–15 October 1954
- INDIPEX '73 international philatelic exhibition, New Delhi, 14–23 November 1973
- ASIANA 1977 (1st Asian International Stamp Exhibition), Bangalore, 19–23 October 1977.
- India '80, Indian International Stamp Exhibition, New Delhi, 25 January- 3 February 1980 (FIP)
- India '89 World Philatelic Exhibition, New Delhi, 20–29 January 1989 (FIP)
- Indepex '97 world philatelic exhibition, New Delhi, 15–22 December 1997 (FIP)
- INDEPEX ASIANA 2000 (14th Asian International Stamp Exhibition), Calcutta (now Kolkata, 7–12 December 2000.
- Indipex 2011, New Delhi, 12–18 February 2011 (FIP)

==== Pakistan ====
- ECOPHILEX '86 International Stamp Exhibition, Islamabad, 21–24 December 1986
- Pakistan Youth Stamps Collectors Association "PYSCA"

local, Peshawar organize by. Peshawar Stamp Society 1. Peshphx 87 2. Peshphx 90 3. Peshphx 92 4. Peshphx 93 5. Peshphx 94 6, Peshphx 95

=== Southeast ===
==== Indonesia ====
- INDOPEX 1993 (6th Asian International Stamp Exhibition), Surabaya, 29 May-4 June 1993.
- JAKARTA 1995 (8th Asian International Stamp Exhibition), Jakarta, 19–25 August 1995.
- JAKARTA 2008 (22nd Asian International Stamp Exhibition), Jakarta, 23–28 October 2008.
- INDONESIA 2012 (World Stamp Championship and Exhibition), Jakarta Convention Center, 18–24 June 2012 (FIP)
- BANDUNG 2017 World Stamp Exhibition (35th Asian International Stamp Exhibition), Bandung, 3–7 August 2017 (FIP).
- INDONESIA 2022 World Stamp Exhibition, Jakarta, 4–9 August 2022 (FIP)

==== Malaysia ====
- KUALA LUMPUR 1992 (5th Asian International Stamp Exhibition), Kuala Lumpur, 1–7 September 1992
- MALAYSIA 2014 World Youth Exhibition (29th Asian International Stamp Exhibition), Kuala Lumpur, 1–6 December 2014 (FIP)
- MALAYSIA 2020, Kuala Lumpur, Nov/December 2020 (FIP) The exhibition will not happen, as Jakarta City is the venue for the exhibition.

==== Philippines ====
- PHICIPEX 1954 Philippine Centenary International Philatelic exhibition, Manila, 25 April-9 May 1954

==== Singapore ====
- PHILEX 1987 (3rd Asian International Stamp Exhibition), Singapore, 21–23 December 1987
- SINGPEX 1994 (7th Asian International Stamp Exhibition), Singapore, 31 August-2 September 1994
- Singapore 1995 World Stamp Exhibition, Singapore, 1–10 September 1995
- SINGPEX 1998 (12th Asian International Stamp Exhibition), Singapore, 23–26 July 1998
- Singapore World Stamp Championship 2004, Singapore, 28 August-1 September 2004 (FIP)
- Singapore 2015 World Stamp Exhibition, Singapore, 14–19 August 2015 (FIP)
- SINGPEX 2019 (36th Asian International Stamp Exhibition), Singapore, 31 July-4 August 2019

==== Thailand ====
- Bangkok International Stamp Exhibition 1983, Bangkok, 4–13 August 1983
- THAIPEX 1989 (4th Asian International Stamp Exhibition), Bangkok, 4–8 August 1989.
- Bangkok world philatelic exhibition 1993, Bangkok, 1–10 October 1993 (FIP)
- BANGKOK 2000 (13th Asian International Stamp Exhibition), Bangkok, 25 March-3 April 2000 (FIP)
- Bangkok 2003 International Stamp Exhibition, Bangkok, 4–13 October 2003 (FIP)
- BANGKOK 2007 (20th Asian International Stamp Exhibition), Bangkok, 3–12 August 2007.
- Bangkok 2010 (25th Asian International Stamp Exhibition), Bangkok, 4–12 August 2010.
- Thailand 2013 World Stamp Exhibition, Bangkok, 2–8 August 2013 (FIP)
- BANGKOK 2016 (32nd Asian International Stamp Exhibition), Bangkok, 10–15 August 2016.
- Thailand 2018 World Stamp Exhibition, Bangkok, 28 November–3 December 2018 (FIP)
- THAILAND 2025 Asian International Stamp Exhibition, Bangkok, 8-12 August 2025

== Oceania ==
=== Australia ===
- International philatelic exhibition, Melbourne, 29 October-1 November 1928
- 5th Australasian Philatelic Exhibition, Sydney, March 1932
- MIPEX '63 International Philatelic Exhibition, Melbourne, 7–12 October 1963
- SYDPEX '80 World Philatelic Exhibition, Sydney,
- AUSIPEX '84 World Philatelic Exhibition, Melbourne, 21–30 September 1984 (FIP)
- STAMPEX 1986 (2nd Asian International Stamp Exhibition), Adelaide, South Australia, 4–10 August 1986.
- SYDPEX 88 : Bicentennial national stamp exhibition, R.A.S. Showground 30 July to 7 August
- Australia 99: the Melbourne World Stamp Expo, Melbourne, 19–24 March 1999 (FIP)
- Pacific Explorer 2005 International Stamp Exhibition, Sydney, 21–24 April 2005 (FIP)
- AUSTRALIA 2013 World Stamp Exhibition, Melbourne, 10–15 May 2013 (FIP)
- National Exhibition 10–12 October 2014, Drill Hall, Torrens Parade Grounds, Adelaide
- Melbourne 2017 (34th Asian International Stamp Exhibition), Melbourne, 30 March-2 April 2017 (FIP)

=== New Zealand ===
- Canterbury Centennial International Philatelic Exhibition, Canterbury, 18–25 November 1950
- New Zealand International Stamp Exhibition, Auckland, 16–22 July 1955
- PANPEX '77 International Stamp Exhibition, Christchurch, 5–12 March 1977
- Zeapex '80 International Stamp Exhibition, Auckland, 23–31 August 1980
- NZ National Philatelic Literature Exhibition (held every two years since 1989)
- New Zealand 1990 World Stamp Exhibition, Auckland, 24 August-2 September 1990 (FIP)
- Auckland 2018 – Remembrance International Stamp Exhibition, Auckland, 8–13 November 2018
- NZ 2020 FIAP 37th Asian International Stamp Exhibition, Auckland, 19–22 March 2020

Cancelled due to outbreak of COVID-19

=== Papua New Guinea ===
- PANGEX 1967 Philatelic Exhibition, Port Moresby, 1–3 September 1967

== Europe ==
=== West ===
==== Austria ====
- Wiener Philatelistenclub Postwertzeichenausstellung, Vienna, 13–20 November 1881
- Internationalen Postwertzeichen-Ausstellung, Wien, 20 April-4 May 1890
- Internationalen Postwertzeichen-Ausstellung, Wien, 7–17 September 1911
- Internationalen Postwertzeichen-Ausstellung, Wien, 1–9 September 1923
- WIPA 1933 Internationale Postwertzeichen-Ausstellung = International philatelic exhibition, Wien, 24 June-9 July 1933
- Wipa 1965 Wiener Internationale Postwertzeichenausstellung, Wien-Hofburg, 4–13 June 1965
- IFA WIEN 1968 Internationale Flugpost-Ausstellung, Wien, 30 May-4 June 1968
- Wien '75 Internationale Briefmarkenausstellung, Wien, 27 November-7 December 1975
- Wipa 1981 Wiener Internationale Postwertzeichenausstellung, Vienna, 22–31 May 1981 (FIP)
- WIPA 2000 - Wiener Internationale Postwertzeichen-Ausstellung, Vienna, 30 May-4 June 2000 (FIP)
- WIPA08 Briefmarken-Weltausstellung, Wien, 18–21 September 2008 (FIP)

==== Belgium ====
- Exposition Internationale de Timbres-Poste, Anvers, 1887
- Exposition Internationale de Timbres Poste, Bruxelles May 26, 1921
- Exposition Internationale de Timbres Poste, Bruxelles May 24-June 01, 1924
- Anver/Antwerpen Philatelic Days, November 03-04, 1928
- Exposition Universelle de Timbres-Poste, Anvers, August 09–15, 1930
- Antwerp Aerophilatelic Exhibition, October 14-15, 1931
- SITEB Philatelic Exhibition, Brussels, May 1935
- Inauguration of the new Borgerhout Town Hall and Philatelic Exhibition, October 1936
- Seraing Belgium Philatelic Exhibition. January 16-18, 1937
- Leuven Belgium Royal Circle Philatelic Exhibition, December 1937
- Conference Internationale Aeropostale, Bruxelles, June 16-25, 1938
- Verviers Belgium Youth Philatelic Exhibition December 15, 1938
- Exposition Philatélique, Bruxelles, October 28, 1945
- Ghent Philatelic Days, September 22, 1946
- BEPITEC Exposition Philatelique International du Centenaire, Brussels, 1–10 July 1949
- Woluwe Belgium Philatelic Exhibition, March 15-17, 1952
- Hoeillaart Belgium Philatelic Exhibition Pro Youth, May 12, 1952
- Seconds Exposition Philatelique Liegeois, September 22-25, 1956
- Expo '58, Brussels Universal & International Exposition
- Belgica 72 Exposition Philatélique Internationale = Internationale Filatelistische Tentoonstelling, Brussels, 24 June-9 July 1972 (FIP)
- THEMABELGA '75 Wereldtentoonstelling Van Thematische Filatelie, Brussels, 13–21 October 1975 (FIP)
- Belgica 82 Exposition Philatélique Internationale = Internationale Filatelistische Tentoonstelling, Brussels, 11–19 December 1982 (FIP)
- Belgica 2001 International Stamp Exhibition, Brussels, 9–15 June 2001 (FIP)
- Belgica '06 International Stamp Exhibition, Brussels, 16–20 November 2006 (FIP)
- Antverpia 2010, Antwerp, 9–12 April 2010

==== France ====
- L'Exposition Internationale de Timbres-Poste au Champ-de-Mars, Paris, 15–24 September 1892
- Exposition Philatelique Internationale, Paris, 28 August-9 September 1900
- Exposition Philatelique Internationale, Paris, 21–30 June 1913
- Exposition Philatelique internationale Paris, 2–12 May 1925
- Exposition Philatelique internationale, Strasbourg, 4–12 June 1927
- Exposition Philatelique internationale, Le Havre, 18–26 May 1929
- Exposition Internationale de Poste Aerienne (EIPA), Paris, 6 November-24 December 1930
- Pexip: Exposition philatélique internationale, Paris, 18–27 June 1937
- Citex-Paris 1949 Exposition du centenaire du timbre poste français, Paris, 1–12 June 1949
- Philatec '64 Exposition Philatelique internationale, Paris, 5–21 June 1964
- ARPHILA '75 Exposition Philatelique internationale, Paris, 6–16 June 1975 (FIP)
- Philexfrance '82, Paris, 11–21 June 1982 (FIP)
- Philexfrance '89 exposition mondiale de philatélie, Paris, 7–17 July 1989 (FIP)
- Philexfrance '99 exposition philatélique mondiale, Paris, 2–11 July 1999 (FIP)
- Salon du timbre et de l'écrit (Paris, one-shot in 1994, every two years since 2004 up to 2014)

==== Germany ====
- Internationale Postwertzeichen-Ausstellung, Munich, 29 September-9 October 1889
- Die Internationale Ausstellung von Postwertzeichen, Magdeburg, 4–11 May 1890
- Internationale Postwertzeichen-Ausstellung, Mülhausen i. Eis, 12–16 April 1903
- Internationale Postwertzeichen-Ausstellung, Berlin, 25 August-4 September 1904
- Internationale Postwertzeichen-Ausstellung, Kassel, 9–23 August 1914
- IPOSTA 1930 Internationale Postwertzeichen-Ausstellung = International Philatelic Exhibition, Berlin, 12–21 September 1930

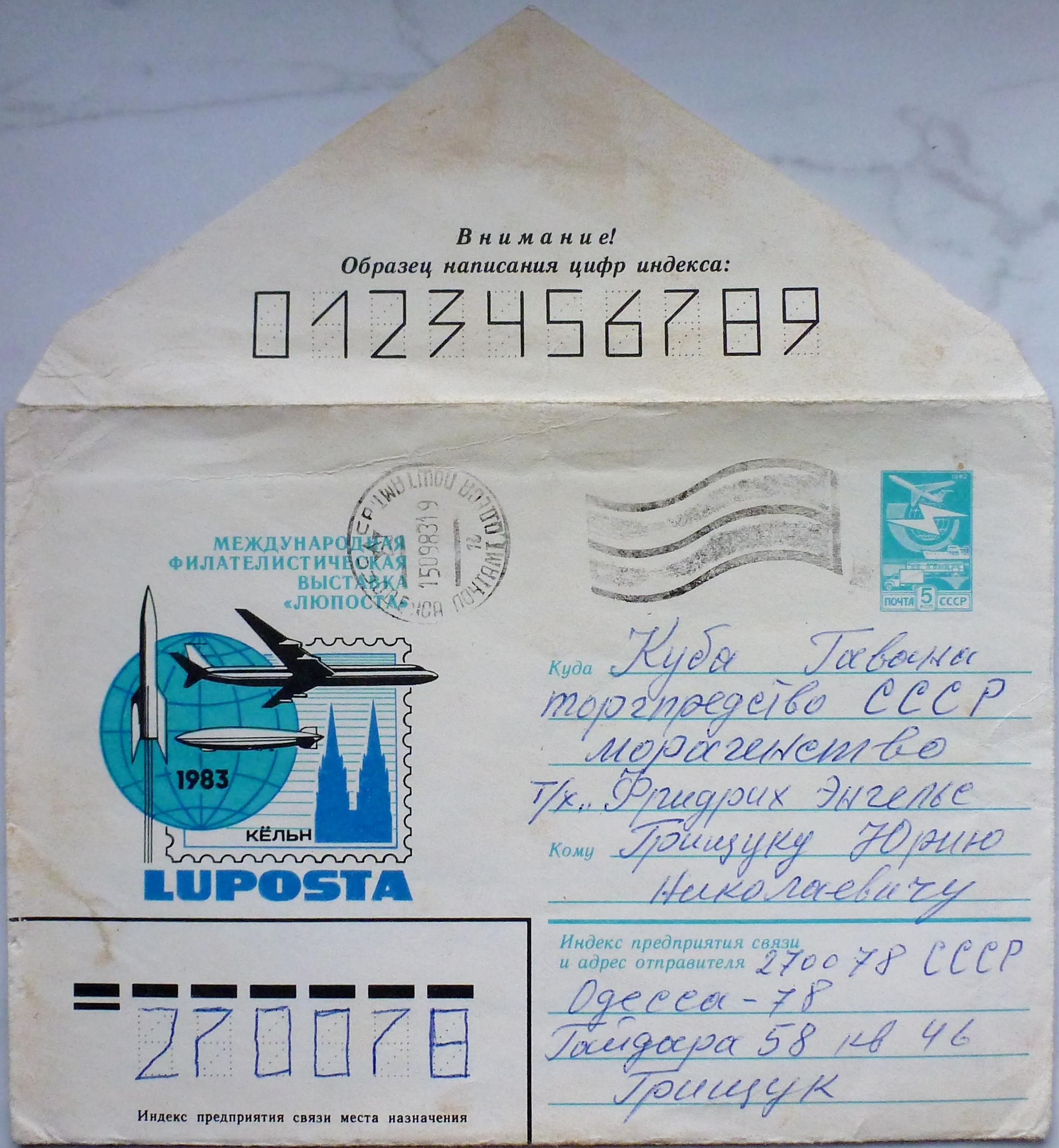
Soviet letter's envelope in honor of the Internationale Philatelic Exhibition LUPOSTA in Cologne in 1983.

- Mophila Internationale Ausstellung Moderner Philatelie, Hamburg, 22–30 August 1931
- Ostropa 1935 Internationale Osteuropäische Postwertzeichen-Ausstellung, Königsberg, 23 June-3 July 1935
- Interposta 1959 Internationale Postwertzeichen-Ausstellung, Hamburg, 22–31 May 1959
- Internationale Briefmarkenschau der Messestädte, Leipzig, 1 August-18 September 1960
- LUPOSTA 1962 Internationale Luftpost Ausstellung, Berlin, 12–16 September 1962
- IBRA München '73 Internationale Briefmarken Ausstellung, Munich, 11–20 May 1973 (FIP)
- IKUBA '74 Internationale Briefmarken Ausstellung, Kulmbach, 2–11 August 1974
- SOZ-PHILEX 77 Internationale Briefmarken-Ausstellung, East Berlin, 19–28 August 1977
- ESSEN '80 Internationale Briefmarken Ausstellung, Essen, 15–19 November 1980
- LUPOSTA 1983 Internationale Briefmarken Ausstellung, Cologne, 1983
- Salon der Philatelie zum XIX Weltpostkrogreb Hamburg, Germany, June 19-26, 1984
- SOZPHILEX Postgeschichte '85 Briefmarken-Ausstellung, East Berlin, 4–13 October 1985
- LILIENTHAL 91 Internationale Briefmarken Ausstellung, Dresden, 16–25 August 1991 (FIP)
- IBRA 99 Internationale Briefmarken Ausstellung, Nuremberg (FIP)
- IBRA 2009, Essen.
- IBRA 2023, Essen, 25–28 May 2023 (FIP)

==== Luxembourg ====
- Exposition internationale des timbres-poste, Luxembourg, 4–8 September 1927
- Centilux 1952 Exposition internationale du centenaire des timbres-poste luxembourgeois, Luxembourg, 24 May-4 June 1952
- Melusina 1963 Exposition internationale de timbres-poste, Luxembourg, 13–21 April 1963
- JUVENTUS '69 International Youth Stamp Exhibition, Luxembourg, 3–8 April 1969 (FIP)
- JUVALEX '78 International Youth Stamp Exhibition, Luxembourg, 6–10 April 1978 (FIP)
- JUVALEX '98 International Youth Stamp Exhibition, Luxembourg, 18–21 June 1998 (FIP)

==== Monaco ====
- Exposition Philatelique Internationale, Monte Carlo, 18–26 February 1928
- Reinatex 1952 Exposition philatélique internationale, Monte Carlo, 6 April-4 May 1952
- Exposition Philatelique: 100 Years of Monaco's Stamps, Monte Carlo, 5–8 December 1985
- Exposition Philatélique Internationale, Monte Carlo, 13–17 November 1987
- Monaco'97, 1997
- MonacoPhil 1999
- MonacoPhil 2000
- MonacoPhil 2002
- MonacoPhil 2004
- MonacoPhil 2006
- MonacoPhil 2011
- Exposition Philatélique Internationale, Monte Carlo, 4–6 December 2009
- Monacophil 2013, Monte Carlo, 5–7 December 2013
- Monacophil 2015, Monaco, 2–5 December 2015

==== Netherlands ====
- Internationale Postzegeltentoonstelling, 's-Gravenhage, 17–22 July 1896
- Internationale Postzegeltentoonstelling, 's-Gravenhage, 10–19 August 1901
- Internationale Postzegeltentoonstelling, Amsterdam, 3–10 June 1909
- Internationale Postzegeltentoonstelling, 's-Gravenhage, 6–17 September 1924
- ITEP '52 Internationale Tentoonstelling Eeuwfeest Postzegel, Utrecht, 28 June-6 July 1952
- Amphilex '67 internationale filatelistische tentoonstelling, Amsterdam, 11–21 May 1967
- Amphilex '77 Internationale postzegeltentoonstelling, Amsterdam, 26 May-5 June 1977 (FIP)
- Filacento Internationale postzegeltentoonstelling ter gelegenheid van 100 jaar georganiseerde filatelie in Nederland, Den Haag, 6–9 September 1984
- Filacept '88 Holland Europa Internationale Postzegeltentoonstelling, [Den Haag]. 18–23 October 1988
- FEPAPOST 94 internationale postzegeltentoonstelling, Den Haag, 17–23 October 1994
- Amphilex 2002, Amsterdam, 30 August-3 September 2002

==== Switzerland ====
- Exposition Internationale de Timbres-Poste, Geneva, 8–23 August 1896
- Internationale Postwertzeichen-Ausstellung, Berne, 3–12 September 1910
- Exposition Internationale de Timbres-Poste, Geneva, 3–12 September 1922
- Imaba 1948 Internationale Briefmarken-Ausstellung = Exposition philatélique internationale = Esposizione filatelica internazionale = International philatelic exhibition, Basle, 21–29 August 1948
- INTERNABA 1974 Internationale Briefmarkenausstellung = Exposition philatélique internationale, Basle, 7–16 June 1974 (FIP)
- LURABA '81 International Stamp Exhibition, Lucerne, 17–24 March 1981 (FIP)
- TEMBAL '83 International Thematic Stamp Exhibition, Basle, 21–29 March 1983 (FIP)
- Ticino '2003 esposizione internazionale di filatelia, Locarno, 18–22 June 2003
- HELVETIA 2022 World Stamp Exhibition, Lugano, 18–22 May 2022 (FIP)

=== East ===
==== Bulgaria ====
- Sofia 1969 World Philatelic Exhibition, Sofia, 31 May-8 June 1969
- PHILASERDIKA '79 World Philatelic Exhibition, Sofia, 18–27 May 1979 (FIP)
- Bulgaria '89 World Philatelic Exhibition, Sofia, 22–31 May 1989 (FIP)
- Bulgaria '99 World Philatelic Exhibition, Sofia, 5–10 October 1999
- European Philatelic Exhibition, Sofia, 27–31 May 2009
- BULGARIA 2020, Plovdiv,

30 September-2020 - 4 October(FIP). Cancelled due to outbreak of COVID-19.

==== Czech Republic ====
- BRNO 1923 Mezinarodni vystavy postovnich znamek, Brno, 5–15 August 1923
- Praga 1938 International Philatelic Exhibition, Prague, 26 June-4 July 1938
- Praga 1955 Mezinarodni vystava postovnich znamek, Prague, 10–25 September 1955
- Praga 1962 Světová výstava poštovních známek, Prague, 18 August-2 September 1962
- Praga 1968 World Stamp Exhibition, Prague, 22 June-7 July 1968
- Praga 1978 World Stamp Exhibition, Prague, 8–17 September 1978 (FIP)
- Světová výstava poštovních známek Praga 1988, Prague, 26 August-4 September 1988 (FIP)
- Praga 1998 mezinárodní výstava poštovních známek, Prague, 7–10 September 1998
- BRNO 2005 European Stamp Exhibition, Brno, 10–15 May 2005
- Praga 2008 International Stamp Exhibition, Prague, 12–14 September 2008 (FIP)
- Praga 2018 World Stamp Exhibition, Prague, 15–18 August 2018 (FIP)
- Liberec 2022 European Stamp Exhibition and Polar Salon, Liberec, 13–16 October 2022 (FIP)

==== Hungary ====
- Budapest 1961 International Stamp Exhibition, Budapest, 23 September-3 October 1961
- Budapest '71 International Stamp Exhibition, Budapest, 4–12 September 1971
- EUROFILEX'85, Budapest, 14–31 October 1985
- EUROFILEX'92, Budapest, 12–16 September 1992
- Hunphilex 2000, Budapest, 18–21 August 2000
- Hunfila 2002 International Stamp Exhibition, Budapest, 3–6 October 2002
- Hunfila 2007 International Stamp Exhibition, Budapest, 27–30 September 2007
- Hunphilex 2022, Budapest, 31 Mar–3 April 2022

==== Poland ====
- BALPEX, Gdansk, 1959
- POLSKA '60 Międzynarodowa Wystawa Filatelistyczna, Warsaw, 27 September-9 October 1960
- POLSKA 73 Światowa Wystawa Filatelistyczna = World Postage Stamp Exhibition, Poznan, 19 September-2 October 1973 (FIP)
- POLSKA '93 World Philatelic Exhibition, Poznan, 7–16 May 1993 (FIP)
- Świętochłowice 2000 International Philatelic Exhibition, Świętochłowice, 12–18 October 2000
- POLKOWICE 2011 European Youth Stamp Exhibition, Polkowice, 1–7 October 2011 (FEPA)

==== Romania ====
- BALKANPHILA’91, Bacau, 20–24 September 1991
- World Philatelic Exhibition, Bucharest, 20–27 June 2008 (FIP)

==== Russia ====
- "Большой Урал - 82" (English: Big Ural - 82) - Stamp Exhibition in Chelyabinsk, Ural region of the USSR, in 1982 in honor of 60 anniversary of the USSR creation.
- Moskva '97 Vsemirnai︠a︡ filatelistskai︠a︡ vystavka = World Philatelic Exhibition, Moscow, 17–26 October 1997 (FIP)
- St Petersburg 2007 International Stamp Exhibition, St. Petersburg, 19–25 June 2007 (FIP)

==== Slovakia ====
- Medzinárodná Výstava Poštových Známok Slovensko 2002, Bratislava, 4–10 July 2002

=== North ===
==== Denmark ====
- Hafnia '76 International Stamp Exhibition, Copenhagen, 20–29 August 1976 (FIP)
- Hafnia '87 World Philatelic Exhibition, Copenhagen, 16–25 October 1987 (FIP)
- Hafnia '94 World Philatelic Exhibition, Copenhagen, 27–30 January 1994 (FIP)
- Hafnia '01 World Philatelic Exhibition, Copenhagen, 16–21 October 2001 (FIP)
- Nordia 2017, Vejle, 27–29 October 2017

==== Finland ====
- Finlandia 56, Helsinki-Helsingfors, 7–15 July 1956
- Finlandia 88 filatelian maailmannäyttely = filatelisk världsutställning = world philatelic exhibition, Helsinki, 1–12 June 1988 (FIP)
- Finlandia '95 World Stamp Exhibition, Helsinki, 10–15 May 1995 (FIP)
- Finlandia 2017 European Stamp Exhibition, Tampere 24–28 May 2017 (FIP)

==== Ireland ====
- STAMPA (annual national stamp exhibition since 1972)

==== Norway ====
- Internasjonal Frimerkeutsilling, Oslo, 4–12 June 1955
- Nidaro '78 Nordic Fairmark Exhibition Trordheim Norway, 19–24 September 1978
- NORWEX '80 International Stamp Exhibition, Oslo, 13–22 June 1980 (FIP)
- NORWEX 97 spesialisert filatelistisk verdensutstilling for posthistorie og luftpost = specialized world philatelic exhibition for postal history and aerophilately, Oslo, 16–21 April 1997 (FIP)

==== Sweden ====
- IBERO-AMER Frimarksexpo, Stockholm, 12 October 1949
- Stockholmia '55 Filatelistiska Världsutställningen, Stockholm, 1–10 July 1955
- Stockholmia '74 Internationell Frimärksutställning, Stockholm, 21–29 September 1974 (FIP)
- Stockholmia '86 Internationell Frimärksutställning, Stockholm, 29 August-7 September 1986 (FIP)
- Stockholmia 2019 Internationell Frimärksutställning, Stockholm, 29 May-2 June 2019

==== United Kingdom ====
- London Philatelic Exhibition 1890
- London Philatelic Exhibition 1897
- International Philatelic Exhibition, City Art Gallery, Manchester, 29 June-5 July 1899
- International Philatelic Exhibition, Caxton Hall, Westminster, 23 May-1 June 1906
- Jubilee International Stamp Exhibition, Royal Horticultural Hall, London, 14–19 October 1912
- London International Stamp Exhibition, Royal Horticultural Hall, London, 14–26 May 1923
- APEX International Air Post Exhibition
- Stamp Centenary Exhibition 1940
- London International Stamp Exhibition 1950
- London International Stamp Exhibition 1960
- Royal Philatelic Society London's Centenary Exhibition, Seymour Hall, London, 11–20 April 1969
- Philympia 1970
- APEX 73 International Airmail Exhibition
- London 1980 International Stamp Exhibition (FIP)
- Stamp World London 1990 (FIP)
- EURAPEX'93 Aerophilatelic exhibition, London, 2–7 March 1993.
- The Stamp Show 2000 (FIP)
- London 2010 International Stamp Exhibition (FIP)
- London 2015 Europhilex
- London 2022 International Stamp Exhibition (FIP)
- Stampex, London
- EuroPhilEx Birmingham 2025, 7-11 May 2025

=== South ===
==== Italy ====
- Exposition Philatelique Internationale, Milan, 1894
- Exposition Philatelique Internationale, Turin, 1898
- Exposition Philatelique Internationale, Milan, 16–23 September 1906
- International philatelic exhibition, Torino, 14–23 October 1911
- Sicilia '59 esposizione filatelica internazionale, Palermo, 16–26 October 1959
- Italia '66 esposizione filatelica internazionale con sezione numismatica, Udine, 26–31 July 1966
- ITALIA '76 Esposizione mondiale di filatelia = World Stamp Exhibition, Milan, 14–24 October 1976 (FIP)
- Italia '85 esposizione mondiale di filatelia, Rome, 25 October-3 November 1985 (FIP)
- Genova '92 esposizione mondiale di filatelia tematica, Genova, 18–27 September 1992 (FIP)
- Italia '98 Esposizione mondiale di filatelia, Milan, 23 October-1 November 1998 (FIP)
- ITALIA 2009 International Philately Festival, Rome, 21–25 October 2009

==== Malta ====
- Maltex (annually 2000-)
- Gozo Philatelic Society Exhibition (annually 1999-)
- Wirja Filatelika ta' Malta (annually 1970–1999)
- Żejtun Philatelic Exhibition (annually every September 2003-) by the Żejtun Philatelic Group

==== Portugal ====
- PORTUGAL 1953 da Exposicao Filatelica International, Lisbon, 3–11 August 1953
- PORTUGAL '77 World Thematic Exhibition, Oporto, 19–28 November 1977 (FIP)
- PORTUGAL 1998, Lisbon, 4–13 September 1998 (FIP)
- PORTUGAL 2010 World Stamp Exhibition, Lisbon, 1–10 October 2010 (FIP)

==== San Marino ====
- San Marino 77: centenario del francobollo della Repubblica di San Marino, San Marino, 28 August-4 September 1977

==== Slovenia ====
- Filatelistična razstava z mednarodno udeležbo = Philatelic Exhibition with International Participation, Ljubljana, 15–19 September 1999
- Maribofila 2012 International Philatelic Exhibition, Maribor, 24–27 May 2012

==== Spain ====
- 1950 Exposicion Conmemorativa Del Sello Español ECSE, Madrid, 12–22 October 1950 (FIP)
- Exposicion Y Congreso Internacional De Barcelona CIF-60, Barcelona, 26 March-6 April 1960 (FIP)
- España '75: Exposición Mundial de Filatelia, Madrid, 4–13 April 1975 (FIP)
- Espamer '80 Exposición Filatélica de América y Europa, Madrid, 3–12 October 1980
- España '84: Exposición Mundial de Filatelia, Madrid, 27 April-6 May 1984 (FIP)
- Espamer '87 Exposición Filatélica de América y Europa, La Coruña, 2–12 October 1987
- GRANADA '92 Exposición Mundial de Filatelia = World Stamp Exhibition, Granada, 24 April-3 May 1992 (FIP)
- ESPAMER '96 Exposición Mundial de Filatelia Aviación y Espacio, Seville, 4–12 May 1996 (FIP)
- LORCA '98 Exposicion Mundial De Literatura Y Filatelia Moderna, Granada, 3–7 June 1998 (FIP)
- España 2000 Exposición Mundial de Filatelia, Madrid, 6–14 October 2000 (FIP)
- España 2004 Exposición Mundial de Filatelia, Valencia, 22–30 May 2004 (FIP)
- España 2006 Exposición Mundial de Filatelia, Malaga, 7–13 October 2006 (FIP)

== North America ==
=== Canada ===
- CAPEX '51 Canadian International Philatelic Exhibition, Toronto, 21–29 September 1951
- SARPHEX International VI 1959, Sarina, Ontario, May 15-17, 1959
- CAPEX '78 Canadian International Philatelic Exhibition, Toronto, 9–18 June 1978 (FIP)
- CAPEX '87 Canadian world philatelic exhibition, Toronto, 13–21 June 1987 (FIP)
- PHIL-EX CANADA. Royal York Hotel, Toronto, January 12-14, 1990
- CAPEX '96 world philatelic exhibition = exposition philatélique mondiale, Toronto, 8–16 June 1996 (FIP)
- Royal*2011*Royale, RPSC Annual Convention, Dorval, Quebec
- VANPEX, annual regional philatelic exhibition sponsored by the British Columbia Philatelic Society
- CAPEX '22 International Philatelic Exhibition, Toronto, 9–12 June 2022

=== Mexico ===
- EFIMEX International Philatelic Exhibition, Mexico City, 1–9 November 1968

=== St Pierre et Miquelon ===
- SPM EXPO 2014, St Pierre et Miquelon, 24–28 September 2014
- SPM EXPO 2017, St Pierre et Miquelon, 1–4 June 2017

=== United States ===
==== International ====
- International Philatelic Exhibition (Engineering Societies' Building, New York, 27 October – 1 November 1913)
- International Philatelic Exhibition (Grand Central Palace, New York, 16–23 October 1926)
- TIPEX (Third International Philatelic Exhibition, Grand Central Palace, New York, 9–17 May 1936)
- CIPEX (Centenary International Philatelic Exhibition, Grand Central Palace, New York City, 17–23 May 1947)
- FIPEX (Fifth International Philatelic Exhibition, New York Coliseum, New York City, 28 April – 6 May 1956)
- SIPEX (Sixth International Philatelic Exhibition, Washington, D.C., 21–30 May 1966)
- INTERPHIL Seventh International Philatelic Exhibition, Philadelphia, 29 May– 6 June 1976 (FIP)
- AMERIPEX, Rosemont, IL, 1986 (FIP)
- OLYMPHILEX, Atlanta, GA, 19 July– 3 August 1996
- PACIFIC '97, San Francisco, CA (FIP)
- WASHINGTON 2006, Washington, D.C., 27 May– 3 June 2006 (FIP)
- World Stamp Show-NY 2016 Jacob K. Javits Convention Center, New York City (FIP)
- Boston 2026 World Expo, Boston, 23–30 May 2026 (FIP)

==== APS Sponsored National ====
- Great American Stamp Show

==== APS World Series ====
- Americover - sponsored by the American First Day Cover Society (see Great American Stamp Show)
- BALPEX - Baltimore, Maryland
- CHICAGOPEX - Chicago, Illinois
- COLOPEX - Columbus, Ohio
- FLOREX – Orlando, Florida
- Garfield-Perry March Party - Cleveland, Ohio
- Great American Stamp Show - various locations
- INDYPEX - Indianapolis, Indiana
- MILCOPEX - Milwaukee, Wisconsin
- Minnesota Stamp Expo - Minneapolis, Minnesota
- NAPEX – Washington, D.C.
- NOJEX – northern New Jersey
- OKPEX - Oklahoma City, Oklahoma
- Philatelic Show - Boston, Massachusetts
- PIPEX - multiple locations in Oregon
- Plymouth Show Detroit, Michigan
- Rocky Mountain Stamp Show - Denver, Colorado (formerly ROMPEX)
- San Diego Stamp Show - San Diego, California
- St. Louis Stamp Expo - St. Louis, Missouri
- Sarasota National Stamp Exhibition - Sarasota, Florida
- SEAPEX - Seattle, Washington
- Southeastern Stamp Expo - Atlanta, Georgia
- WESTPEX - San Francisco, California

==== Local ====
- ARIPEX - multiple locations in Arizona
- BOPEX - Bowie, Maryland (Bowie Philatelic Exhibition)
- CHARPEX - Charlotte, North Carolina (Charlotte Philatelic Society)
- COMPEX - Chicago, Illinois
- FALLSPEX - (Cuyahoga Falls Stamp Club)
- Filatelic Fiesta - San Jose, California (San Jose Stamp Club)
- HUNTSPEX - Huntsville, Alabama (Huntsville Philatelic Club)
- MEMPHEX - Memphis, Tennessee (Memphis Stamp Collectors Society)
- Omaha Stamp Show - Omaha, Nebraska
- PENPEX - Redwood City, California (Sequoia Stamp Club)
- WISCOPEX - various Wisconsin cities (Wisconsin Federation of Stamp Clubs)

==== Defunct or on Hiatus ====
- AmeriStamp Expo - American Philatelic Society winter show
- National Topical Stamp Show - sponsored by the American Topical Association (see Great American Stamp Show)
- ROPEX - Rochester, New York
- SEPAD (Southeast Pennsylvania and Delaware)
- StampShow - American Philatelic Society summer show (see Great American Stamp Show)
- TEXPEX - Dallas, Texas
- VAPEX (Virginia)

==== Puerto Rico ====
- ESPAMER '82 International Philatelic Exhibition, San Juan, 12–17 October 1982

== South America ==
=== Argentina ===
- EFIMAYO 1960 Exposición filatélica interamericana, Buenos Aires, 12–24 October 1960
- Buenos Aires '80 International Stamp Exhibition, Buenos Aires, 24 October-2 November 1980 (FIP)
- Argentina '85 (IV Exposición Mundial de Temática) International Stamp Exhibition, Buenos Aires, 5–14 July 1985 (FIP)
- Expo Río Grande 2012 Exposición Internacional de Filatelia, Rio Grande, Tierra del Fuego, 27 November-1 December 2012
- Córdoba 2013 Exposición Internacional de Filatelia, Córdoba, 23–27 April 2013
- Exposición Filatélica Internacional Expo Córdoba 2016, Córdoba, 23–27 August 2016 (FIAF)
- Buenos Aires 2019 Exposición Internacional de Filatelia, Buenos Aires, 26–31 August 2019

=== Brazil ===
- Porto Alegre Fiera Filatelica Brazilia November 15–30, 1932
- Porto Alegre Fiera Filatelica Brazilia November 15, 1933
- Brasiliana '79 International Stamp Exhibition, Rio de Janeiro, 15–23 September 1979 (FIP)
- Brasiliana '83 International Stamp Exhibition, Rio de Janeiro, 29 July-7 August 1983 (FIP)
- Brasiliana '93 International Stamp Exhibition, Rio de Janeiro, 30 July-8 August 1993 (FIP)
- Brasiliana 2013 International Stamp Exhibition, Rio de Janeiro, 19–25 November 2013 (FIP)
- Brasilia 2017 Specialized World Stamp Exhibition, Brasilia, 24–29 October 2017 (FIP)

=== Chile ===
- EXFIL 2018 Exposicion Filatélica Continental, Santiago, 9–13 October 2018

=== Colombia ===
- EXFIME 2011 Exposicion Filatélica Interamericana, Medellin, 19–24 October 2011
- Exposicion Filatelica del Pacifico Sur, Bogotá, 4–7 September 2013

=== Costa Rica ===
- EXPOFILATELIA 2013, San José, 1–7 November 2013

=== Paraguay ===
- Bicentenario Paraguay 2011 Exposición Filatélica Continental, Asunción, 5–10 May 2011

=== Uruguay ===
- Uruguay '77 Exposicion Internacional de Filatelia, Montevideo, 29 July-7 August 1977
- URUGUAY 2011 Exposición Internacional Filatélica Temática, Montevideo, 26–30 September 2011
- URUGUAY 2025 World Stamp Exhibition, Punta del Este, 17-22 February, 2025 (FIP)

== See also ==
- Philatelic exhibition
