= London 1980 International Stamp Exhibition =

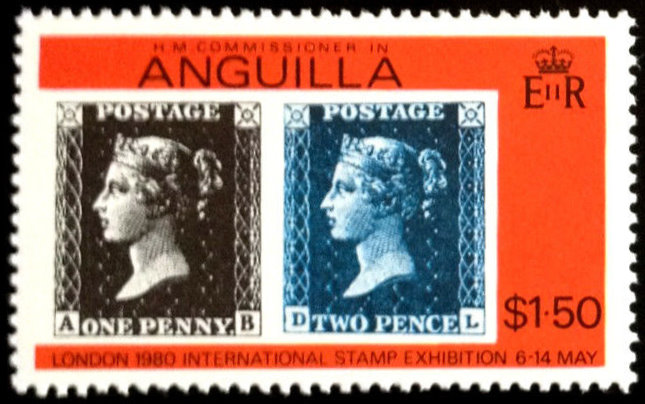
A stamp of Anguilla produced to mark the exhibition.

The London 1980 International Stamp Exhibition was an international stamp exhibition held under FIP (Fédération Internationale de Philatélie) patronage. It was held at Earls Court from 6–14 May 1980.

== British stamp issues ==
A 50p stamp and miniature sheet, both depicting London landmarks, were issued on 9 April to publicise the exhibition (S.G. 1118/1119). They were designed by Jeffrey Matthews and printed by Harrison and Sons using the line engraving process. Previous stamp issues promoting the exhibition included the 1978 Historic Buildings and the 1979 Sir Rowland Hill miniature sheets (S.G. 1058 and 1099). A 10p stamp booklet was also issued to promote the exhibition.

== Special handstamps ==
Visitors to the exhibition were able to obtain special handstamp cancellations for first day covers and other items. The handstamps changed for each day's theme.

- 6 May - National Stamp Day
- 7 May - Post Office Day
- 8 May - Day of the Americas
- 9 May - United Nations Day
- 10 May - Youth Day
- 12 May - Society Day
- 13 May - Commonwealth Day
- 14 May - Europe Day

There was no handstamp used on Sunday, 11 May.

== Palmares ==
The Grand Prix went to the following exhibits:

- Grand Prix d'Honneur: R. B. Pracchia (Brazil) for "Imperial Brazil".
- Grand Prix International: A. Perpina Sebria (Spain) for "Classical Spain 1850-54".
- Grand Prix National: 'Daisy' (Switzerland) for "Queen Victoria".

The following were best in their class:

- Aerophilately: E. Gebauer (Venezuela) for "The Airmail Stamps of Colombia".
- Thematic Philately: M. J. Hecq (Belgium) for "Railways" and Dr. E. Schlunegger (Switzerland) for "Ships and Navigation".

== See also ==
List of philatelic exhibitions (by country)
