= Boston 2026 World Expo =

International exhibition of stamp collecting

Boston 2026 World Expo was an international exhibition of stamp collecting held at the Boston Convention and Exhibition Center from May 23 to 30, 2026.

== Patronage ==
Boston 2026 World Expo was held under the patronage of the Fédération Internationale de Philatélie. It was sponsored by the United States Postal Service.

== Palmares ==
The Grand Prix went to the following exhibits:

- Grand Prix d'Honneur: Alfred Schmidt for "Prussia: The First Three Issues 1850-59".
- Grand Prix International: David Hobden for "Defence of the Border – Canadian Military Mails 1667-1885".
- Grand Prix National: Vernon R. Morris, Jr. for "Transition of American Mail from British Colonial to USPO: 1685 to 1799".

Vernon R. Morris, Jr.'s exhibit also won the American Philatelic Society Champion of Champions Award.

== Organization ==
The organizing committee for Boston 2026 World Expo was led by Yamil H. Kouri Jr., Mark A. Butterline and Michael E. Lawson.

== See also ==
- List of philatelic exhibitions in the United States
