= Stamp Centenary Exhibition 1940 =

Exhibition celebrating the 100th anniversary of the postage stamp

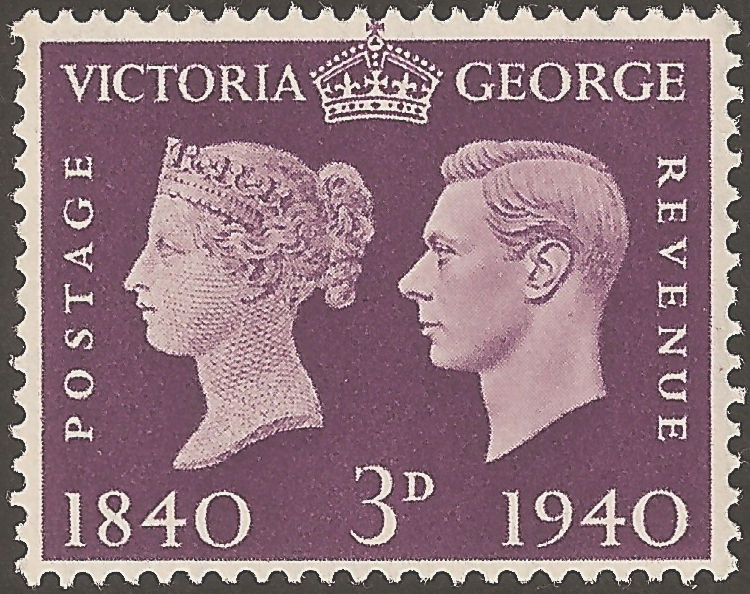
Stamp issued in conjunction with the Stamp Centenary Exhibition marking the centenary of the first postage stamp

The Stamp Centenary Exhibition was an international stamp exhibition. It was held at Lancaster House in London from 6–11 May 1940, under the auspices of the Royal Philatelic Society. It was in aid of the Lord Mayor's Red Cross and St. John Fund. Penny Black reprints (with full gum) were printed by Waterlow and Sons for the exhibition. Miniature sheets were produced in five colors, as well as Cinderella stamp sheets. A set of six commemorative stamps were also released the first day of the exhibition. (Scott catalogue numbers 252-257, all available for modest prices.) Commencement of the Battle of France coincided with its closing days.

== U.S. Celebration ==
In the United States consideration was given to issuing a commemorative postage stamp at the same time as the anniversary of the Penny Black. While designs were developed the plan was dropped for artistic and political reasons. Many unofficial souvenirs were however produced.

== See also ==
- List of philatelic exhibitions (by country)
