= BANDUNG 2017 World Stamp Exhibition =

BANDUNG 2017 Specialized World Stamp Exhibition
- Venue: Trans Studio Convention Cente
- Location: Bandung, Indonesia
- Type: Exhibition

Exhibition logo

The BANDUNG 2017 Specialized World Stamp Exhibition was an international stamp exhibition held 3–7 August 2017 at the Trans Studio Convention Center in Bandung, Indonesia. The exhibition was granted patronage from the Fédération Internationale de Philatélie (FIP).

There were 455 exhibits.

== Palmares ==
The Grand Prix awards went to the following exhibits:

The Grand Prix International went to Ding Jinsong (China) for ‘The 1897 Red Revenue Surcharges of China‘ (97 points).

The Grand Prix National went to Indra Kusuma (Indonesia) for ‘Repoeblik Indonesia 1945–1949, Local Issued Stamps during Independent War in Java Island‘ (96 points).
