= World Stamp Championship Israel 2018 =

The World Stamp Championship Israel 2018 was an international stamp exhibition held from 27–31 May 2018 at the International Convention Centre in Jerusalem, Israel. The exhibition was granted patronage from the Fédération Internationale de Philatélie (FIP).

== Palmares ==
The Grand Prix awards went to the following exhibits:

The World Stamp Champion is Stavros Andreadis from Greece for: "Kassandra Collection – Greece Large Hermes Heads".

The Grand Prix International was received by Kurt Kimmel from Switzerland for: "Venezuela –The Classic issues 1859 -1879".

The Grand Prix National was received by Shaula Alexander from Israel for: "Turkish Post in the Holy Land 1841 -1918- Routes, Rates and Postmarks".

== Souvenir sheet ==
The Israel Postal Company issued a special imperforate souvenir sheet depicting "Jerusalem of Gold" with a printed gold foil. It was issued in a limited edition of 3000, given as a gift inside the exhibition catalogue.
