= London 2022 International Stamp Exhibition =

- Date: 19 February 2022
- Duration: 8 days
- Venue: Business Design Centre
- Location: Islington, London
- Type: Stamp exhibition

London 2022 International Stamp Exhibition was an international stamp exhibition held from 19 to 26 February 2022 at the Business Design Centre in Islington, London. The exhibition was granted patronage from the Fédération Internationale de Philatélie and was recognised by the Federation of European Philatelic Associations.

The exhibition was originally scheduled to be held in 2020 but was postponed due to the COVID-19 pandemic.

== Souvenir sheet ==
Royal Mail issued a special souvenir sheet overprinting the "Stamp Designs of David Gentleman" miniature sheet with the exhibition logo. It was issued on 19 February 2022 and limited to 10,000 copies.

== Palmarès ==
The Grand Prix awards went to the following exhibits:

- The Grand Prix International went to Vittorio Morani (Italy) for "Tuscany 1836 to UPU: Letter mail in, from and to Tuscany: routes, rates and charges" (97 points).
- The Grand Prix National went to Howard Hughes (United Kingdom) for "The Maltese Cross" (97 points).

Best in Class awards went to the following exhibits:

- Traditional Class: Joseph Hackmey (U.K.) for "The Half-Lengths of Victoria" (97 points);
- Postal History Class: Vittorio Morani (Italy) for "Tuscany 1836 to UPU: Letter mail in, from and to Tuscany: routes, rates and charges" (97 points);
- Revenue Philately Class: Michael Mahler (United States of America) for "U.S. Civil War Fiscal History Panorama" (97 points);
- Philatelic Literature (Printed): James Peter Gough (U.S.A.) for "The Postal History Of The UPU: The Postal Card" (97 points);
- Postal Stationery Class: Behruz Nassre-Esfahani (United States of America) for "Persia, Qajar Postal Stationery 1876-1925" (96 points);
- Open Philately Class: Iva Mouritsen (Denmark) for "A Royal Ménage À Trois And Its Historical Consequences" (96 points);
- Thematic Philately: David Griffiths (U.K.) for "Here be Dragons" (96 points);
- Aerophilately Class: Bjorn A. Schoyen (Norway) for "First United Kingdom aerial post 1911 - The first Sustained Air Mail Service in the world" (95 points);
- Philatelic Literature (Digital): Maurice Buxton (U.K.) for "GBPS Website" (95 points);
- Postcards Class: Jennifer Long (New Zealand) for "A study of New Zealand Picture Postcards" (95 points);
- Youth Philately: Dinda Alisha Rahima (Indonesia) for "The Feather Friends" (90 points);
- Modern Class: Guy Heyblom (Belgium) for "Study: Belgium's Royal Portrait King Baudouin, Type 'VELGHE'" (88 points).

The winner of the non-competitive World Stamp Championships was James Peter Gough (U.S.A.) for "UPU and its Impact on Global Postal Services".
