= Penny Black printing plates =

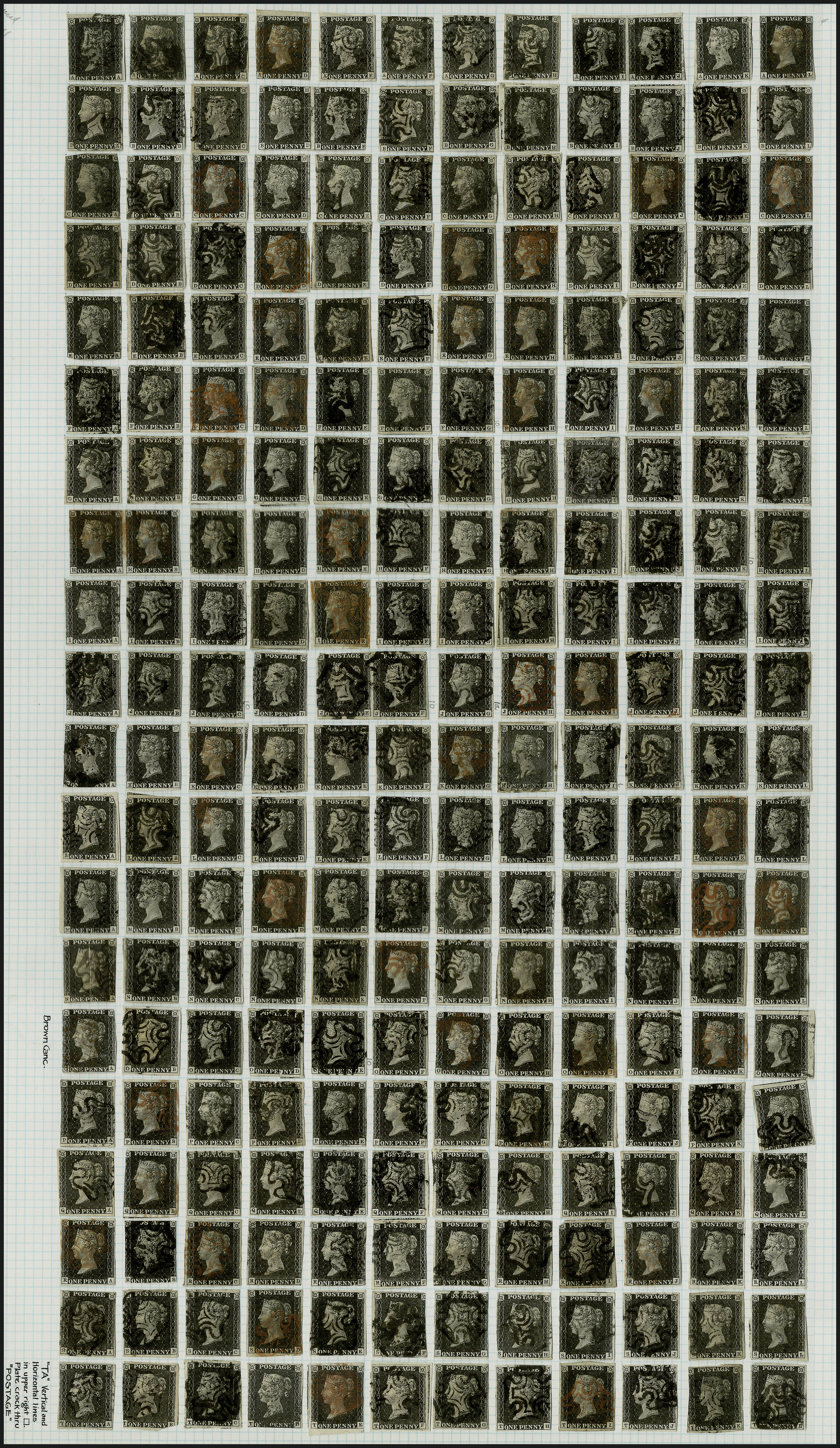
Composite plate reconstruction of 240 used Penny Black stamps

The printing plates for the Penny Black, Two Pence Blue and the Penny Black VR official were all constructed by Perkins Bacon, the printers of the first postage stamps issued in Great Britain.

== Construction stages ==
The construction of these plates was long and complicated, which was intentional so as to make the forgery of the finished article almost impossible.

The first stage involved the engraving of a background for the design. This was produced with a rose engine which laid down a circular pattern of symmetrical design onto a piece of soft steel. This was then partly cleared to leave a square shape and an area in the centre was further cleared in the shape of Queen Victoria's head ready for engraving.

At this stage the die was passed to the engravers who, working from a sketch provided by Henry Cole, engraved the head in the centre.

Following this the labels were engraved at the top and bottom of the die, along with corner squares to take the stars and check letters. Finally the stars were engraved into the top corners.

At this stage the die was hardened and a series of impressions made on a transfer roller, which—as its name implies—was used to transfer the image from the die to the printing plate. The roller was sufficient in size to take between 2 and 8 impressions from the original master die. Once these images were complete on the roller, this was in turn hardened.

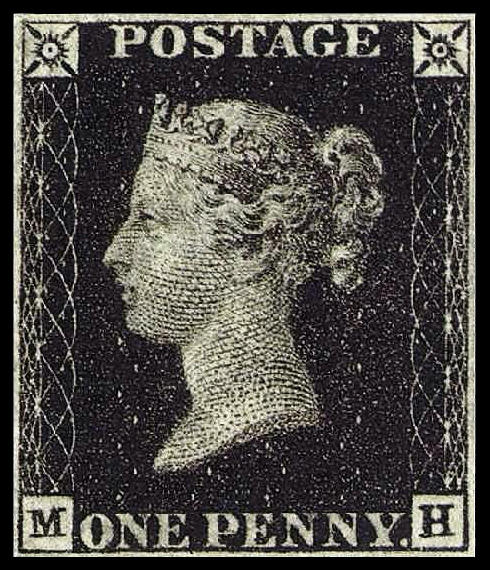
The Penny Black, with visible details of steel engraving.

A sheet of soft steel was cut, sufficient in size to take 240 impressions of the stamps arranged in twenty horizontal rows of twelve. Onto this plate a series of guide dots were marked, some of which were joined with guide lines to allow the correct registration of the impressions. Many of these dots and lines show on the printed stamps and allow them to be correctly assigned to the plate from which they were printed.

Using the transfer roller, the impressions were transferred to the plate under great pressure until the required 240 impressions were completed. Finally the check letters were inserted into the lower corner using hand punches. As such the position of these letters on each stamp differs slightly from one plate to the next and provide an aid for collectors wishing to assign a given stamp impression to its correct plate. Finally the marginal inscriptions were added to the four sides of the sheet using a separate roller and the plate hardened ready for use in production.

== See also ==
- Line engraving
- Steel engraving
