= Stamp World London 1990 =

International stamp exhibition

Coordinates: 51°35′38″N 0°07′48″W

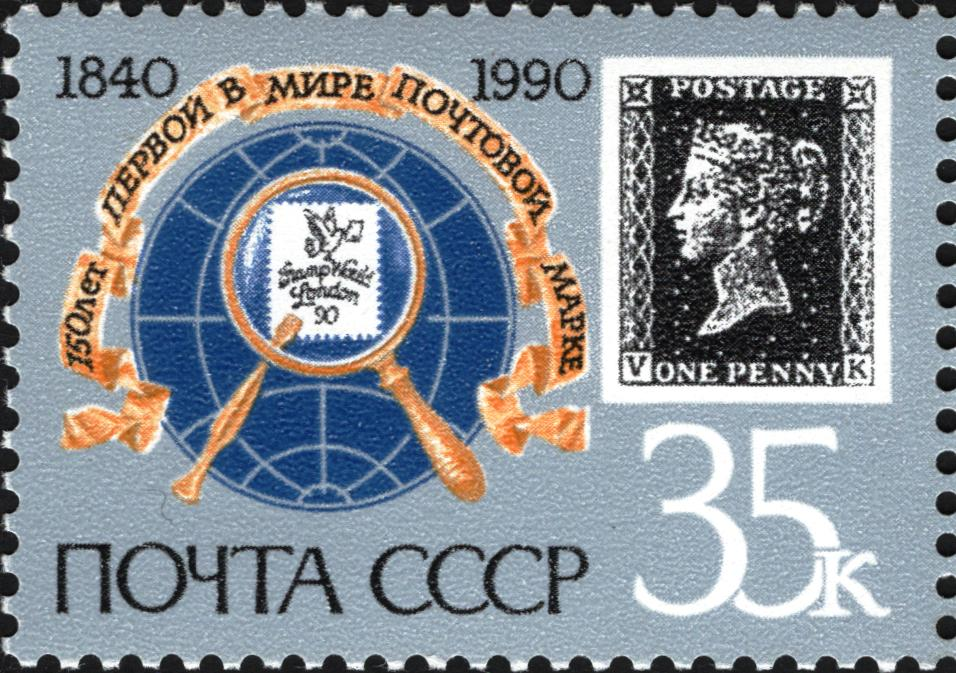
Russian stamp marking the 150th anniversary of the Penny Black.

Stamp World London 90 was an international stamp exhibition held 3-13 May 1990 at the Alexandra Palace, London.

The exhibition celebrated the 150th anniversary of the introduction of adhesive postage stamps, the first two being the Uniform Penny Post and the Penny Black. The centennial of this event occurred in 1940, and any celebration was overshadowed by the reality of World War II. Commemorative stamps were issued by several countries coinciding with this exhibition.

== Handstamp ==
Special handstamps were issued for each day of the exhibition for use on First Day Covers (FDC). 11 in total were issued:

1. Opening day
2. International day
3. Aerophilatelic day
4. Penny Black Day
5. Youth Day
6. Universal Postal Union day
7. British Islands Day
8. Philatelic Literature Day
9. Postal History Day
10. Thematic Day
11. FIP Day

== Palmares ==
The Grand Prix went to the following exhibits:

- Grand Prix d'Honneur: Christian Sundman (Finland) for "Finland: 1638-1885".
- Grand Prix International: 'Batavia' (U.K.) for "South Africa: Triangular Issues of the Cape Of Good Hope".
- Grand Prix National: Hassan Shaida (U.K.) for "Queen Victoria: The Birth of The World's First Postage Stamps".

The FIP Medal was awarded to Gary S. Ryan for his monograph "The Cancellations of Hungarian Post Offices on the First Issue of Hungary 1867-1871".
