= Finlandia 2017 European Stamp Exhibition =

- Location: Finland
- Type: Exhibition

Finlandia 2017 European Stamp Exhibition was an international stamp exhibition held 24–28 May 2017 at the Tampere Hall in Tampere, Finland. The exhibition was granted patronage from the Federation of European Philatelic Associations (FEPA) and the Fédération Internationale de Philatélie (FIP).

The exhibition included 416 different exhibits and 65 philatelic literature items in competitive classes.

== Palmares ==
The Grand Prix awards went to the following exhibits:

The Grand Prix Finlandia 2017 went to Jean Voruz (Switzerland) for ‘Geneva Postal Services 1839-1862‘.

The Grand Prix International went to Joseph Hackmey (United Kingdom) for ‘Classic Romania‘ (97 points).

The Grand Prix National went to Erkki Toivakka for ‘Finland: Finland 1856-1875‘ (96 points).
