= Stampa (disambiguation) =

Stampa is a former municipality in the canton of Graübunden, Switzerland.

Stampa can also refer to:

== Places in Norway ==
- Stampa (valley), valley in Lindesnes municipality, Agder county
- Stampa (hill), hill in Alta municipality, Finnmark county
- Stampa (Alta mountain), mountain in Alta municipality, Finnmark county
- Stampa (Aurland mountain), mountain in Aurland municipality, Vestland county
- Stampa (stream), stream in Aurland municipality, Vestland county

== Other uses ==
- Italian-language word for printing press or news media
- Stampa family, Italian noble family
- Stampa (philatelic exhibition), stamp exhibition held in Dublin, Ireland

== See also ==
- La Stampa, Italian newspaper
