= Stockholmia 2019 Internationell Frimärksutställning =

Stamp exhibition

The Stockholmia 2019 Internationell Frimärksutställning was an international stamp exhibition held from 29 May–2 June 2019 at the Waterfront Congress Centre in Stockholm, Sweden. It was held to celebrate the 150th anniversary of the Royal Philatelic Society London. The exhibition was granted patronage from the Fédération Internationale de Philatélie (FIP).

== Palmares ==
The Grand Award went to Daniel Ryterband (United States) for: "A Country Divided: Effects of the American Civil War on the Mails".

The Best in Class went to the following exhibits:

- CLASS 1 Traditional Philately. Gordon E. Eubanks for "First Federally Issued Postage Stamp of the United States". (98 points)
- CLASS 2 Postal History was won by the Grand Award exhibit. (98 points)
- CLASS 3 Postal Stationery. Lennart Daun for "1872-1897 The First Period of Postal Stationery in Sweden". (96 points)
- CLASS 4 Revenue. Ralph Ebner for "First Americans, Spanish Papel Sellado, First Emission 1640/41 and its Usages". (90 points)
- CLASS 5 Aerophilately. Jean-Claude Vasseur for "Newfoundland Airmail 1919/1939". (96 points)
- CLASS 6 Thematic Philately. Joachim Maas for "Matematiks, a Science between Theory and Application". (97 points)
- CLASS 7 Open Philately. John Davies for "A Jubilee Reminiscence". (92 points)
- CLASS 8 Picture Postcards. Seija-Riitta Laakso for "Paris by Night". (92 points)
- CLASS 9 Philatelic Literature. "Perkins Bacon Great Britain Line-Engraved Postage Stamp Printing 1840–1846" by Alan Druce. (97 points)
