= Brasilia 2017 Specialized World Stamp Exhibition =

- Date: October 24–29, 2017
- Venue: Ulysses Guimarães Convention Center
- Location: Brasília, Brazil
- Type: International stamp exhibition
- Patron: Fédération Internationale de Philatélie (FIP)

Official logo

The Brasilia 2017 Specialized World Stamp Exhibition was an international stamp exhibition held 24–29 October 2017 at the Ulysses Guimarães Convention Center in Brasília, Brazil. The exhibition was granted patronage from the Fédération Internationale de Philatélie (FIP).

The exhibition included 464 different exhibits in competitive classes.

== Palmares ==
The Grand Prix awards went to the following exhibits:

The Grand Prix D'Honneur went to Luis Alemany (Spain) for ‘Spain - Rates During Isabel II Reign: 1850–1865‘.

The Grand Prix International went to Walter Britz (Uruguay) for ‘The Postal History of Uruguay (1779–1880)‘ (96 points).

The Grand Prix National went to Pablo A. Reim (Argentina) for ‘Brazil Classics Stamps, 1843–1861‘ (97 points).

The Best Youth Award went to José Carlos Rodriguez Piñero (Spain) for ‘Postal Stationery of Mexico "Serie Multas"‘ (90 points).
