= POLSKA '93 World Philatelic Exhibition =

Official exhibition logo

The POLSKA '93 World Philatelic Exhibition was an international stamp exhibition held 7–16 May 1993 in Poznań, Poland. The exhibition was granted patronage from the Fédération Internationale de Philatélie (FIP).

== Palmares ==
The Grand Prix awards went to the following exhibits:

- The Grand Prix d'Honneur went to Raymond Casey (U.K.) for Russian Posts in the Far East.
- The Grand Prix International went to Peng Hian Tay (Singapore) for Burma 1817–54.
- The Grand Prix National went to Maciej Miszczak (Poland) for Polish pre-adhesive and classic stamps (Polskie znaki pocztowe w XVIII i XIX wieku).
