= London 2015 Europhilex =

London 2015 Europhilex logo

London 2015 Europhilex was an international stamp exhibition held 13–16 May 2015 at the Business Design Centre in Islington, London. The exhibition has been granted patronage from the Federation of European Philatelic Associations (FEPA) and the Fédération Internationale de Philatélie (FIP).

The exhibition included 1400 frames of competitive exhibits and a demonstration of stamp forger Jean de Sperati's printing press.

The thematic arm of the show was the European Championship for Thematic Philately, Essen, Germany, 7–9 May 2015.

== Palmares ==
The Grand Prix awards went to the following exhibits:

The Grand Prix D’Honneur went to James Peter Gough for ‘The UPU and Its Impact on Global Postal Services’.

The Grand Prix National went to Alan Holyoake for ‘Secured Delivery Leading to the Introduction of UK Registration of Internal, External and Transit Mail 1450-1852‘ (97 points).

The Best in Class awards went to the following exhibits:

Traditional Class: Joseph Hackmey for ‘Classic Switzerland‘ (97 points);

Postal History Class: James Peter Gough for ‘The UPU and Its Impact on Global Postal Services‘ (97 points);

Postal Stationery Class: Henrik Mouritsen for ‘The Classic Postal Stationery of Denmark 1865-1905‘ (96 points);

Aerophilately Class: Jean-Claude Vasseur for ‘Newfoundland Airmail‘ (95 points);

Revenue Philately Class: Andy Taylor for ‘The Austrian Newspaper tax‘ (91 points);

Open Philately Class: Birthe King for ‘Denmark: Conscience, Conflict and Camps 1932-1949‘ (96 points);

Youth Philately: Hanna Pilipovich for ‘On the 100th Anniversary of the Romanov Series‘ (84 points);

Thematic Philately: Damian Laege for ‘Fascinated in Feathers‘ (98 points);

Philatelic Literature: Luis Frazao for ‘Portuguese Pre-stamp Period Postmarks, Volume 2‘ (96 points).
