= Israel '98 World Stamp Exhibition =

International stamp exhibition in 1998

The Israel '98 World Stamp Exhibition was an international stamp exhibition held from 13–21 May 1998 at the Israel Trade Fairs and Convention Center in Tel Aviv, Israel. The exhibition was granted patronage from the Fédération Internationale de Philatélie (FIP).

== Palmares ==
The Grand Prix awards went to the following exhibits:

- The Grand Prix d'Honneur – Edgar Kuphal (Germany) for "Hamburg"
- The Grand Prix International – Gene Scott (United States) for "Uruguay: the "Sun" Issues, 1856-1862"
- The Grand Prix National – Joseph Hackmey (Israel) for "Holyland - Ottoman Period"
