= Stampa (philatelic exhibition) =

Irish stamp exhibition

- Status: Active
- Genre: National Philatelic Exhibition
- Frequency: Annually
- Venue: Griffith College Conference Centre, South Circular Road, Dublin
- Locations: Dublin, Ireland
- Country: Ireland
- Years active: 1972 (47 years)
- Website: www.stampa.ie

Stampa is an annual Irish national level stamp exhibition and trade show currently held at the Griffith College Conference Centre, South Circular Road, Dublin, usually in October. The three-day event is organised by the council members of Stampa and has been held each year since 1972.

== Features of the show ==
Since its establishment, Stampa has held philatelic competitive displays from Ireland and overseas. An Post, the Irish postal administration are frequently present with their philatelic department and current stamp issue with special cancellations on the days of the show.

The event is held over three days and also consists of trade stands from stamp dealers from Ireland and Europe who are members of the Irish Philatelic Traders Association and the Philatelic Traders Society of Great Britain. Stampa is a national exhibition and philatelic judging is according to a standard criteria, and follow the guidance of the FIP (Fédération Internationale de Philatélie) in determining and judging exhibits in terms of marks out of 100. A medal and/or a trophy is awarded if a specified standard is achieved.

== History ==
The first event was held in Ireland House on St. Stephen’s Green in December 1972, on the 50th anniversary of the first Irish stamp issue. David Feldman the noted Irish philatelist, held three of his public stamp exhibitions in Dublin before being elected chairman of Stampa in 1972, the first year of the exhibition. Stampa has been held in various Dublin venues, the Gresham Hotel in 1974, and then was regularly held at the Royal Dublin Society complex. Since 2016, it has been held in the Conference Centre in Griffith College, Dublin. A former army barracks and named after Arthur Griffith, the College was established in 1992 and the Conference Centre opened in 2006. The philatelic exhibition and traders are currently held in the upper level Auditorium Hall of the Centre.

== Exhibition classes and competitions ==
The philatelic exhibition at Stampa holds competitions in the following classes:

- Aerophilately
- Open Class
- Picture Postcards (since 2017)
- Postal History
- Postal Stationery
- Revenue stamps
- Thematic
- Traditional Philately
- Novice class (one frame)
- Philatelic Literature

== Trophies and awards ==
Exhibits are judged based on compliance with Fédération Internationale de Philatélie standards. Medals and a certificate of achievement are awarded if the following points are achieved: Gold (85+), Large Vermeil (80-84), Vermeil (75-79), Large Silver (70-74), Silver (65-69), Silver Bronze (60-64), Bronze (55-59).

A 5-frame exhibit awarded a Vermeil, Large Vermeil or Gold medal will qualify entry to an International Exhibition. An exhibit in each category including one frame class that achieves the most points is awarded a trophy as best exhibit.

== Souvenirs and admission ==
Admission is free of charge and visitors can purchase a philatelic souvenir available to commemorate the show. These souvenirs come in the form of a Stampa overprinted Irish stamp issue, cover, or postcard with the show dates and venue. Past souvenirs included the sinking of the RMS Lusitania, (2015) and the 1916 Rising (2016). Stampa members can receive a souvenir overprinted Irish miniature stamp sheet and postage stamp booklet.

== See also ==
List of philatelic exhibitions (by country)
