= London International Stamp Exhibition 1950 =

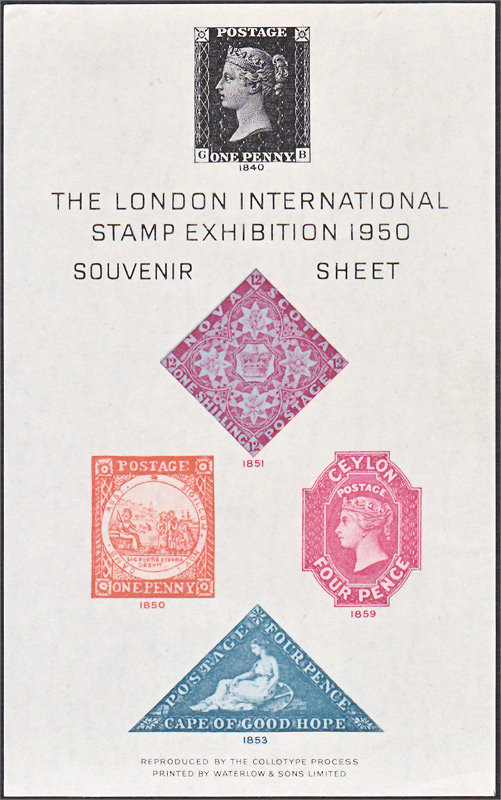
The souvenir sheet for the London International Stamp Exhibition 1950.

The London International Stamp Exhibition 1950 was held in the Great Room, Grosvenor House, Park Lane from 6–13 May 1950, under the chairmanship of Sir John Wilson, Keeper of the Royal Philatelic Collection. A non-postal souvenir sheet was produced by Waterlow and Sons for the event using the collotype process. It depicted the Penny Black; Nova Scotia 1851 1/-; New South Wales 1850 1d Sydney View; Ceylon 1859 4d; Cape of Good Hope 1853 4d triangular. A souvenir cover showing St. George and the dragon was also available

== Palmares ==
The principal awards went to the following exhibits:

The Grand Prix went to Herbert C. Adams (U.K.) for ‘Great Britain’.

Gold Awards of Honour went to: Harry Osborne for ‘Great Britain’; Gerald Wellburn for ‘Canada, British Columbia, etc.’; H. W. Hurlock for ‘Trinidad’; L. E. Dawson for ‘India and States’; Dr. F. E. Wood for ‘Straits Settlements and States’; M. Scheerlinck for ‘Belgium’; Eduardo Cohen for ‘Romania’; Dr. H. Leeman for ‘Switzerland’; D. C. Gray for ‘Netherlands’; R. Hoffman for ‘Uruguay’; C. F. Meroni for ‘Development of World Mails’; R. Abecassis for ‘Portuguese India’.

== See also ==
- List of philatelic exhibitions (by country)
