= Perkins Bacon =

Printer of books, banknotes, and postage stamps

Details on the mode of preventing the forgery of bank notes
- England’s currency was being forged at an alarming rate. The smaller bills were even being forged by people with little skill. They made this a crime punishable by death, but this did nothing to stop the forgery. England had the Royal Society create several reports on the problems, starting about 1818. They looked worldwide at currencies and really liked the American inventor Jacob Perkins’ bills for Massachusetts. The new USA «National Bank» chose Perkins plates to print the new national currency in the USA. In England, Charles Heath even gave a speech about him to the Royal Society. Jacob Perkins not only invented soft steel plates that could be hardened after being engraved, he also invented a roller which would apply higher pressure, and 64 piece plates (and more: nails, fire equipment, etc.). An expensive lathe technique was employed to make complicated designs for currencies (Asa Spencer invented it and sold the rights, and became an employee). Charles Heath wrote letters asking Jacob Perkins to come to England, as England was offering a £20,000 prize for creating forgery proof notes. Jacob Perkins was paid or loaned £5,000 and went to England with his machines, plates and associates and set up shop confident he would win the award, leaving his brother in charge of his Boston shop. He made presentations, and engraved sample notes. He worked in London for months, until it became clear they were not going to award the contract for national currency to a foreigner. The reports themselves mention Jacob Perkins currency or techniques more than anyone else, and in the end they applied some of his techniques, but did not employ him (at that time). England was currently using copper plates for their currency, and was using 1,500 engraved plates a year. One of the findings of the early reports was that Jacob’s steel plates would cost the Bank half as much to produce bills of much higher quality. They had underestimated the number of impressions from the plates, and the true cost would be less than 1/10 the cost because of the long life of his steel plates.

Messrs. Perkins, Bacon & Co was a printer of books, bank notes and postage stamps, most notable for printing the Penny Black, the world's first adhesive postage stamps, in 1840.

== Origins ==
Jacob Perkins invented and sold "soft steel" plates for engraving that were hardened after being engraved. The plates were between one and three inches thick, and some weighed fifty pounds. He produced some currency in the US, and with engraver Gideon Fairman produced the first books to be engraved on steel in the USA. Several eight-page books Perkins and Fairman's Running Hand. They produced currency for Massachusetts, and had won the contract for the new USA National Bank's currency. They were from Boston, Massachusetts.

Jacob Perkins was enticed to come to England by Charles Heath, because of all the world's currency, Perkins' notes were considered the best. He arrived with Gideon Fairman and Asa Spencer and set up shop as Perkins and Fairman in London, and worked exclusively for several months on the attempt to win the Bank of England project. After a few months, Perkins was indebted to the Heaths for a small sum. Perkins and Fairman added Charles Heath as a partner, and moved their shop to 69 Fleet Street. Charles Heath at times owned half the company.

Jacob Perkins, Gideon Fairman, George Heath (financial contribution only), and Charles Heath formed "Perkins, Fairman, and Heath". They produced some books, stamps, one-pound notes for English banks, and currency. The stamps were the first stamps in the world to have adhesive. Jacob Perkins and Charles Heath also had other successful businesses going at the same time.

Perkins and Charles Heath were not as successful with their finances. They did have good accounting of any debts to the company, and shares sold between themselves, and percentage ownership of every project.

== Brief timeline ==
- 1808–1810 Jacob Perkins and Gideon Fairman produce the first known books in the US to use steel plates.
- c.1816 Jacob Perkins has "soft steel" plates to engrave on, and a method to harden the plates, and a process.
- 1818 (April 15), Heath discussed the American bank notes printed by Perkins at the Society of Arts Committee on Forgery.
- Bank of England was offering a £20,000 prize for unforgeable notes.
- 1819 (May 31) Perkins sets sail for England after communicating with Charles Heath.
- 1819 (June 29) Perkins arrives in Liverpool, England.
- 1819 (July) Sir Joseph Banks met with Perkins.
- 1819 (December 20) The Heaths join Perkins and Fairman forming Perkins, Fairman and Heath.
- 1819 George Heath provides some financial backing only.
- 1820 (Feb) Bank of England chooses another solution, but other business follows, including £1 notes and stamps.
- 1820 (Feb) Perkins among other ventures, goes into the book publishing business with the Heaths and Fairman.
- 1820 (summer) Perkins Fairman and Heath move to 69 Fleet Street, London.
- 1820 (September) Perkins had sold 1,000 plates he had intended to use on the Bank of England project.
- 1822 Perkins and Heath
- 1829 Perkins and Bacon. Joshua Butters Bacon ( Perkins' son in law), buys Heaths interest.
- 1834–1852 Perkins, Bacon & Petch (Henry Petch was an engraver, who was also made a partner).
- 1839 Perkins Bacon and Co are asked to make plates and dies for stamps (the Penny Black was their first stamp).

There is an overlap of Perkins, Bacon & Petch and Perkins, Bacon and Co; not all business ventures included all partners and percentage ownership is detailed as changing, as shares were bought and sold between partners, and money was loaned to partners from the company. Additionally, Charles Heath had many other individual business ventures, as did Perkins. Heath and Perkins had numerous talents and successes, however, they routinely had financial problems. Charles Heath had professional relationships with several people that spanned decades.

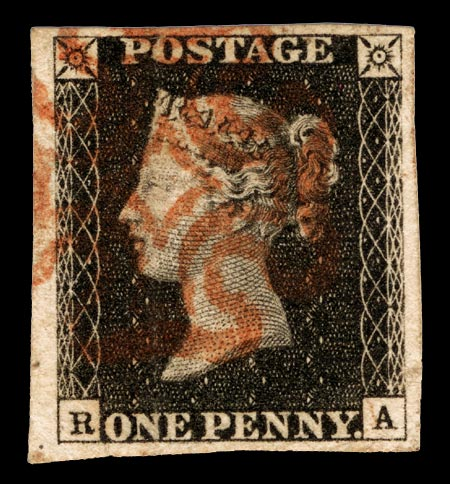
A Penny Black, with a red cancellation that was hard to see and easily removed

== History ==
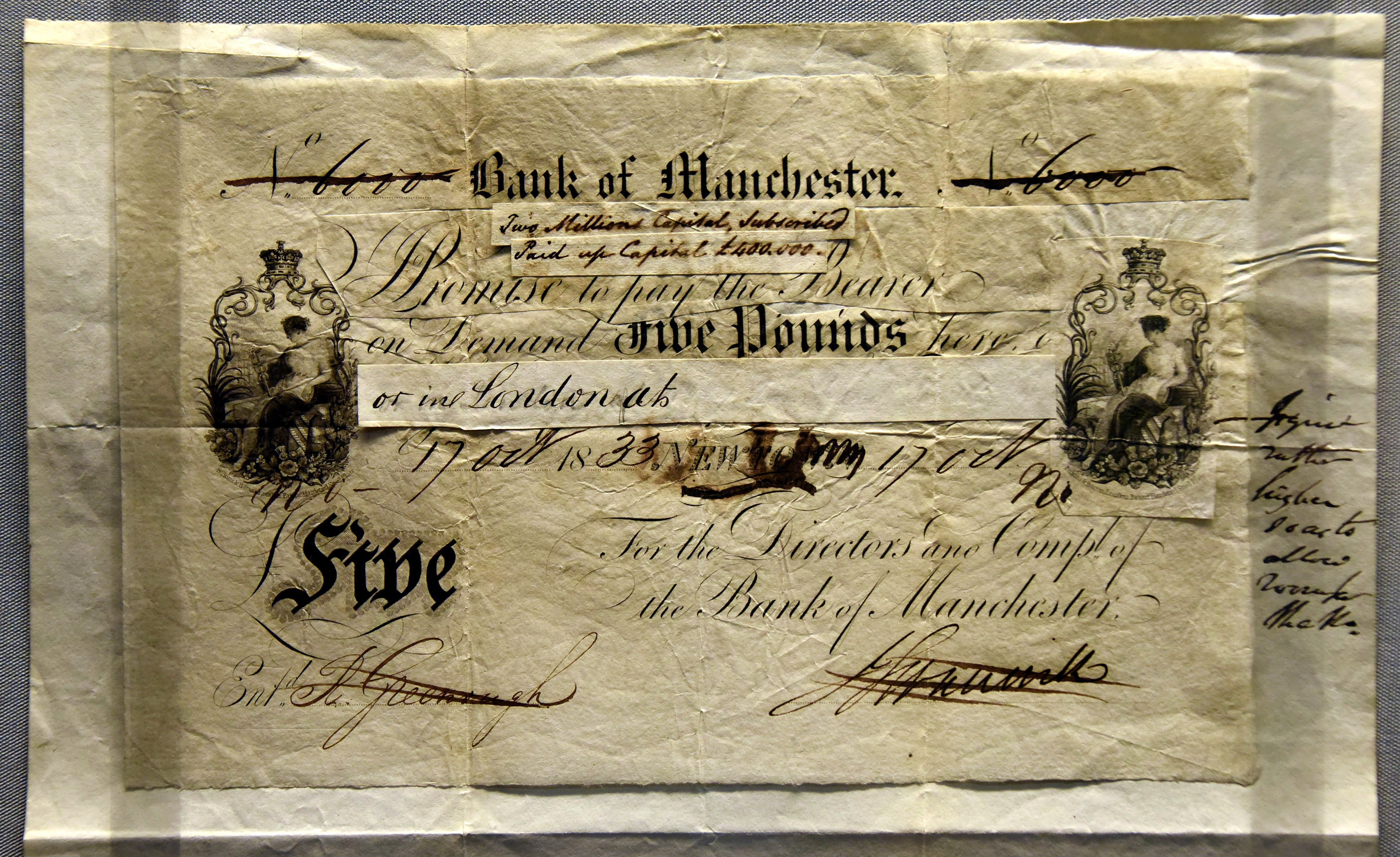
Collage for banknote design, Bank of Manchester (England), 1833, sent to Perkins & Bacon. On display at the British Museum in London

England was offering a prize of £20,000 for a note which was impossible to forge. Heath contacted Perkins and convinced him to come to England; Perkins arrived in Liverpool in 1819. They presented samples to Sir Joseph Banks, President of the Royal Commission on Forgery, and it appeared that they would win. They did not. Perkins started showing signs of financial distress and was in minor debt to the Heaths. They did manage to secure smaller contracts for smaller £1 notes, and later won more government contracts, but in the meantime they started publishing.

George Heath, Charles Heath, Jacob Perkins and Gideon Fairman had multiple partnerships and individual projects going on at the same time. George Heath was a financial backer only. Charles Heath was an engraver, a book publisher. Jacob Perkins was an inventor who made steel book plates practical (but not cheaper). Fairman had produced a book with Perkins in the USA.

Financial difficulties of one or the other partners had at least one of them in debt to the company at any moment in time, and the accounting records from these guys are confusing, but very businesslike. Their percentage of profits of any venture changed often.

By 1822, it was known as "Perkins & Heath", then in 1829, after a complicated transaction in which Heath gave up his shares and Joshua Butters Bacon (Perkin's son in law) bought in, as "Perkins & Bacon". Henry Petch joined in 1835, and thus the firm printing the first stamps was actually known as "Perkins, Bacon & Petch". The Penny Black printing plates are currently [when?] on display at the British Library. When Petch died in 1852, the firm became just "Perkins, Bacon".

In 1861, they (temporarily) lost the contract to print stamps as a punishment for giving copies of new issues away to friends of the management without permission from the governments involved. Although Heath had won another court battle which gave engravers the right to retain 8 impressions of any engraving, this right did not extend to currency or stamps.

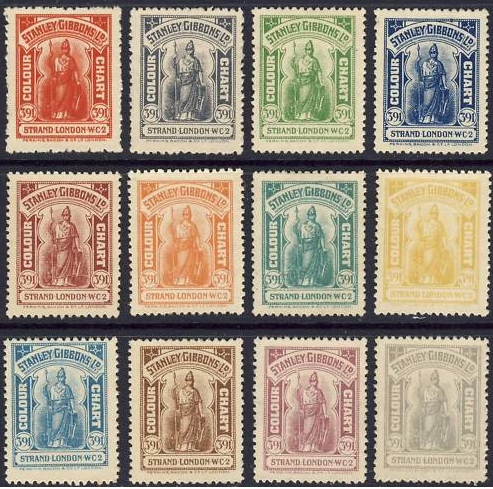
Stanley Gibbons colour guide stamps printed by Perkins Bacon

They completed their printing contract for the line-engraved stamps on 31 December 1879, losing subsequent business to competitor De La Rue.

In addition to British stamps, Perkins, Bacon printed for a number of the colonies, including the first stamps of the Cape of Good Hope, which were printed in 1853.

In 1935, the firm went out of business, and its records were acquired by Charles and Harry Nissen and Thomas Allen. The records were subsequently acquired by the Royal Philatelic Society London where Percy de Worms organised them for publication and display.
