= Gordon Smith (philatelist) =

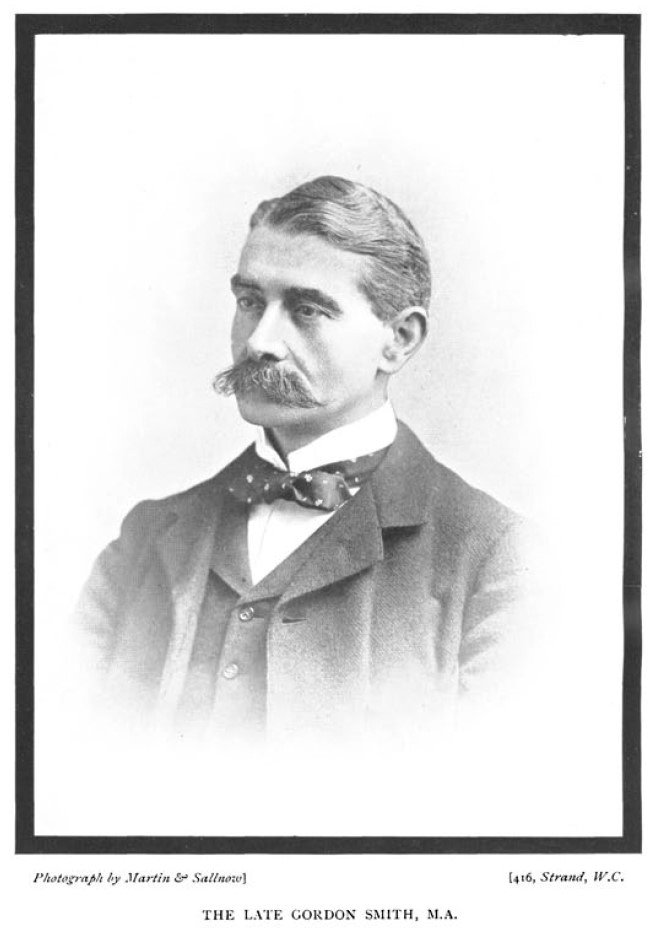
Gordon Smith

Gordon Smith (15 January 1856 – 29 January 1905) was a British barrister and philatelist who was one of the Fathers of Philately named on the Roll of Distinguished Philatelists in 1921.

== Early life ==
Smith was born at Greenwich, London, the son of John N Smith, a civil engineer, and his wife Emma B Smith. He was educated at King's College School, London, and obtained a degree in mathematics from Sidney Sussex College, Cambridge in 1879. He was a tutor in maths at Truro College but left that to study for the bar, being called at Lincoln's Inn in 1882. He was in the chambers of James Aspinall K.C. and Mr. Butler Aspinall.

== Philately ==
Smith rekindled his boyhood interest in philately in 1885, from where it grew to be a consuming passion and a career that he pursued in preference to the law. He was a specialist in the stamps of South Australia and worked for Stanley Gibbons from 1893, becoming a director in 1898. He was active in organising the London Philatelic Exhibition 1897. His collection of South Australia, noted for being the best mint collection formed at the time, passed to Leslie L. R. Hausburg. He was a member of the London Philatelic Society, now the Royal Philatelic Society London, from 1892 and a member of their Council from 1897.

Stanley Gibbons Monthly Journal, in their obituary for Smith, summed up his particular aptitude for philatelic research, and no doubt its appeal to him also, thus: "His legal training had taught him that there are always two sides to a question, and, combined with his mathematical capability, enabled him to distinguish evidence from proof. He recognised the weakness of specialism as well as its strength".

== Other interests ==
Smith was a rower at Cambridge, and after graduating was well known as an oarsman on the River Thames for the Thames Rowing Club. He rowed at stroke in the Grand Challenge Cup, the oldest and best-known event at the annual Henley Royal Regatta at Henley-on-Thames. He was an active freemason and a Major in the Queen's Own Battalion of West Kent Volunteers.

== Death ==
Smith's death at a fairly early age came after a decline in his health over several years, eventually diagnosed as a stomach ulcer. He was operated on but complications set in and he died the following day.

== Publications ==
- South Australia. London: Stanley Gibbons, 1894. (With F.H. Napier)
