= London International Stamp Exhibition 1960 =

The London International Stamp Exhibition was held at the Royal Festival Hall from 9 to 16 July 1960. Souvenir labels were produced for the event depicting Colonel Henry Bishop, as it was the tercentenary of the General Post Office. A non-postal souvenir sheet showing six rare stamps was also produced by Harrison and Sons.

== Palmares ==
The principal awards went to the following exhibits:

The Grand Prix went to Reginald M. Phillips (U.K.) for ‘Great Britain’.

Special Awards went to Gerald E. Anderegg (Switzerland) for ‘Switzerland’ and Mario Tomasini (Italy) for ‘Italian States’.

== See also ==
- List of philatelic exhibitions (by country)
