= Harry Osborne (philatelist) =

British doctor and philatelist (1875–1959)

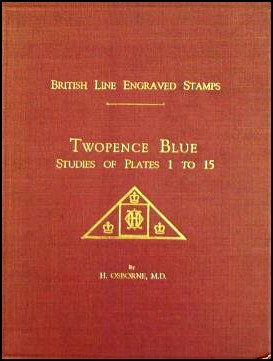
The cover of British Line Engraved Stamps, Twopence Blue - Studies of Plates 1 to 15, 1948.

Harry Osborne MD, MRCS, DPH, (28 November 1875 – 21 June 1959) was a British medical practitioner and philatelist who wrote several important works on classic British stamps and signed the Roll of Distinguished Philatelists in 1954.

Osborne won the Crawford Medal from the Royal Philatelic Society, London for his work on the Great Britain Twopence stamp, Plate 9.

He won a Gold Award of Honour for his stamps of Great Britain at the London International Stamp Exhibition 1950 and was also a student of the stamps of Ceylon and New South Wales.

== Publications ==
- The Ray Flaws of Plates 1 and 2 of the Penny Black, 1935.
- Great Britain Twopence Plate Nine - A Study of the Plate and its Repairs, Chas. Nissen & Co., London, 1939.
- British Line Engraved Stamps, Twopence Blue - Studies of Plates 1 to 15, H.F. Johnson, London 1948.
- British Line Engraved Stamps - Repaired Impressions, H.F. Johnson, London, 1949.
