= International Air Post Exhibition =

International stamp exhibition

The APEX International Air Post Exhibition was held at Royal Horticultural Hall, London from 7–12 May 1934. The organizing director was Fred Melville. A 16p. souvenir programme was published.

== Palmares ==
The principal awards went to the following exhibits:

In the Championship Class:

The Grand Trophy went to John Aspinwall (U.S.A.) for "The 24 cent 1918 carmine and blue, Jenny airmail stamp with inverted center". The Ladies' Trophy went to Miss W. E. Penn-Gaskell (G.B.) for "The development of air transport of mail for the years 1911-1933". The Grand Gold Medal went to Dr. Phillip G. Cole (U.S.A.). Gold Medals were awarded to Mrs. Anson McCleverty (G.B.) and Mr. P. H. Oakey (G.B.).

== See also ==
- List of philatelic exhibitions (by country)
- APEX 73 International Airmail Exhibition - A similar exhibition held in 1973.
