= F. H. Napier =

British Royal Navy officer and philatelist (1850–1929)

Francis John Hamilton Scott Napier
- Born: 20 December 1850
- Died: 18 November 1929 (aged 78)
- Military career
- Allegiance: United Kingdom
- Branch: Royal Navy

Lieut. Commander Francis John Hamilton Scott Napier (20 December 1850 – 18 November 1929) was a Royal Navy officer and British philatelist who signed the Roll of Distinguished Philatelists in 1921.

== Publications ==
- South Australia. London: Stanley Gibbons, 1894. (With Gordon Smith)
- Portuguese India, with Gilbert Harrison. Stanley Gibbons Ltd, Philatelic Handbook No. 1. (1893). Reprinted, 1998.
