= Post Office circular =

United Kingdom Post Office stamp communications

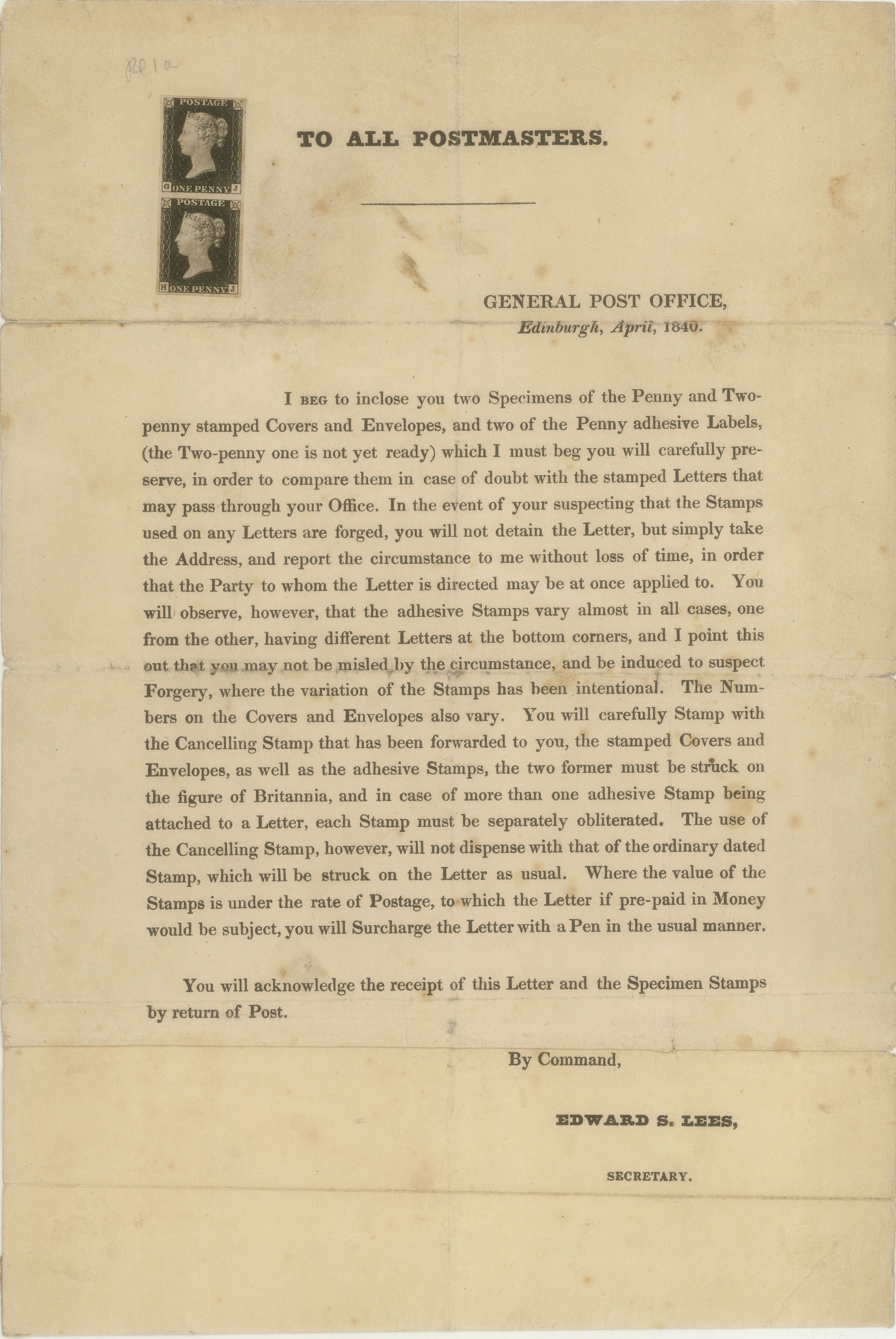
Post Office circular dated 29 April 1840 concerning the introduction of adhesive labels and the Mulready stamped stationery and their cancellation: with a vertical pair of 1d plate 1a GJ-HJ attached

From the introduction of the Penny Black by the British postal system, Post Office Circulars have been sent out from the main office, (originally in Edinburgh), to give information and examples of the new postage stamps which were coming into general use.

The original notice regarding the introduction of postage stamps was sent out in April 1840 and refers to the usage and cancellation of the 1d and 2d stamps. These are usually found with a pair of Penny Blacks attached.

A second notice was sent on 7 May with examples of the 2d stamps as well as the VR official. The pairs of stamps sent with this notice were not originally attached to the notice.

== See also ==
Government circular
