= INTERPHIL 1976 =

International stamp exhibition

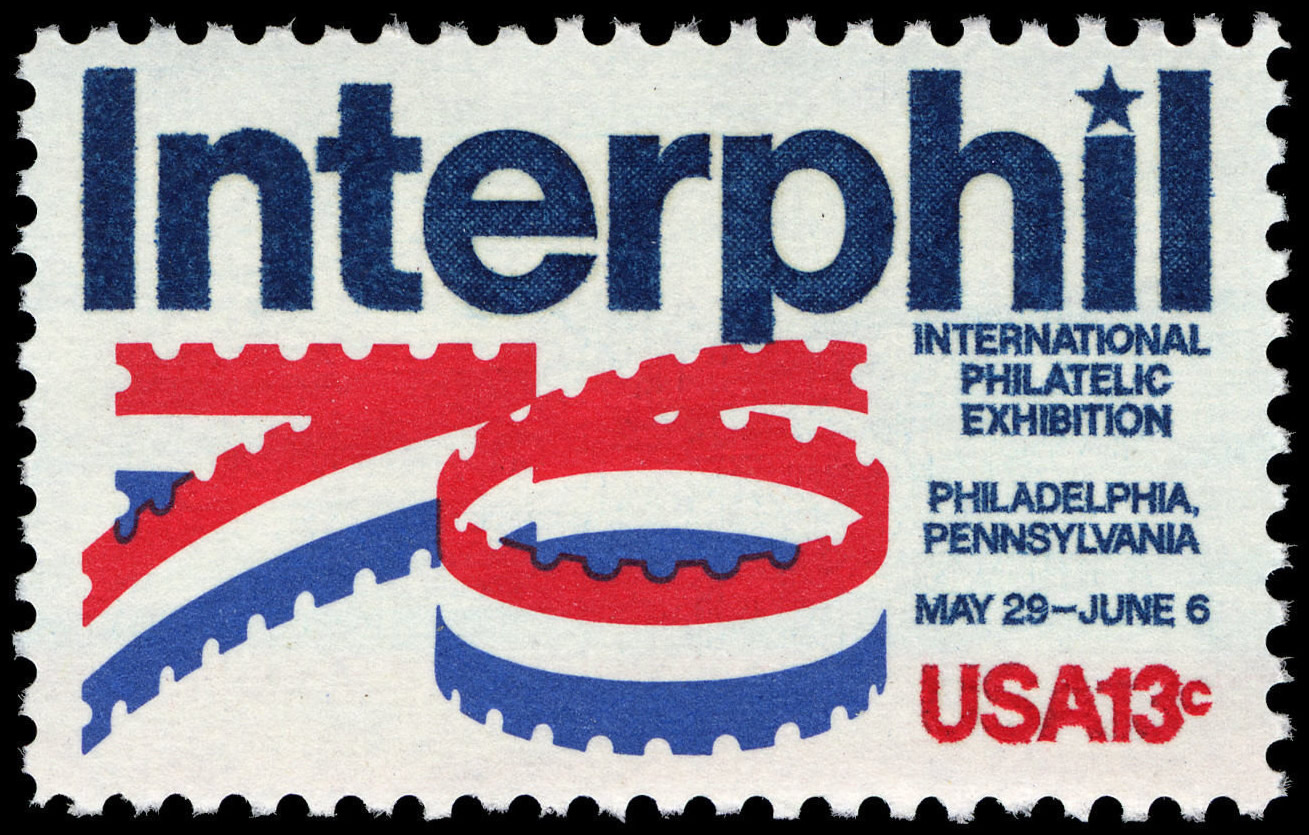
A United States 13c stamp for Interphil

INTERPHIL, or the Seventh International Philatelic Exhibition, was the seventh decennial philatelic exhibition for the United States held under the auspices of the Fédération Internationale de Philatélie (FIP). It was held in Philadelphia, Pennsylvania, from May 29 to June 6, 1976.

The United States Postal Service issued in honor of the convention a commemorative stamp and four different mini sheets each of which portrayed a portion of a famous painting relating to the Revolutionary War. The paintings were: The Surrender of Cornwallis at Yorktown by John Trumbull, The Declaration of Independence by John Trumbull, Washington Crossing the Delaware by Emmanuel Leutze, and The March to Valley Forge by William B. T. Trego.

== Palmares ==
The Grand Prix awards went to the following exhibits:

- The Grand Prix d’Honneur went to Wallace W. Knox (U.S.) for 'Great Britain'.
- The Grand Prix International went to Horst G. Dietrich (Germany) for ‘Afghanistan’.
- The Special Prix d’Honneur went to The Honolulu Advertiser for ‘Hawaiian Missionaries’.
- The Grand Prix National went to Louis Grunin (U.S.) for ‘United States 1847-1861’.
