= London Philatelic Exhibition 1897 =

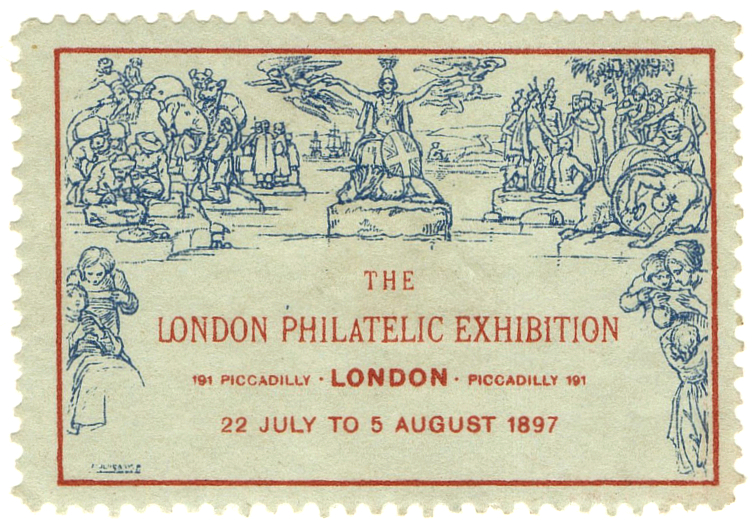
London Philatelic Exhibition 1897 souvenir stamp.

The London Philatelic Exhibition 1897 was held from 22 July to 5 August 1897 at the Royal Institute of Painters in Water Colours, London. It was opened by the Duke & Duchess of York. John Tilleard and Gordon Smith were the principal organisers of the exhibition.

== See also ==
- List of philatelic exhibitions (by country)
