= APEX 73 International Airmail Exhibition =

International stamp exhibition

The APEX 73 International Airmail Exhibition was held at Owens Park, Manchester from 4–7 July 1973, promoted by the Aero Philatelic Club of London under the patronage of the International Federation of Aerophilatelic Societies, (FISA).

== Palmares ==
The principal awards went to the following exhibits:

The Grand Prix International went to L. van de Kar for ‘South Africa, 1911-32’ and The Grand Prix d'Honneur went to "St. John" for ‘Newfoundland Airmails’.

Gold Awards and Special Prizes went to: A. Amaral for ‘San Marino Zeppelins’; N. Socorro Guerra for ‘Universal Airmail’; G. Mochi for ‘"Masarati" Airpost Rarities’.

Other Gold Awards went to: J. H. Levett for ‘Franco-Prussian War, 1870-71’; M. S. Burberry for ‘Great Barrier Island’; G. Kraeber for ‘Rhine and Main Pioneers’; T. C. Marvin for ‘G.B. Airmails’ (Also won the Golden Jubilee Trophy); Lt. Col. S. E. Hands for ‘Bolivia’; G. R. Anstee for ‘England-Australia’.

== See also ==
- List of philatelic exhibitions (by country)
- APEX International Air Post Exhibition - A similar exhibition held in 1934.
