= South African International Stamp Exhibition, 1928 =

South African International Stamp Exhibition
- Venue: Shaw Wool Market, Durban
- Location: South Africa

The South African International Stamp Exhibition was held in the Shaw Wool Market, Durban from 2–12 July 1928, organized by the Philatelic Society of Natal.

== Palmares ==
The principal awards went to the following exhibits:

The Championship Cup went to E. J. Lee (England) for ‘Uruguay’.

Special Silver Cups (and gold medals) went to J. E. M. Coch (Johannesburg) for ‘Rhodesia’ and A. Watson (Pretoria) for ‘Great Britain’.

Special Medals went to Dr. McCann (Liverpool) for ‘Irish Free State’ and W. L. Ashmead (Cape Town) for ‘Jamaica’.

Gold Medals went to:

L. Simenhoff (Cape Town) for ‘Union of South Africa’; H. Mallett-Veale (Prieska) for ‘South West Africa’; A. F. Lichtenstein (New York) for ‘Cape of Good Hope’; H. H. Hurst (Durban) for ‘Natal’; H. B. Hargreaves (London) for ‘Rhodesia’; F. Hugh Vallancey (London) for ‘Great Britain’; E. A. Smythies for ‘India, ½ Anna’; H. Lagerhof (3 medals), G. Ginger (2 medals) and 9 others. There were also 26 Silver and 22 Oxidised Silver medals.

The top literature awards went to Charles Nissen for The Plating of the Penny Black Postage Stamp of Great Britain, 1840 and E. A. Smythies for The Half-Anna Lithographed Stamps of India, 1854-1855.

== See also ==
List of philatelic exhibitions (by country)
