= South African Tercentenary International Stamp Exhibition =

- Date: 5 April 1952
- Duration: 26 March 1950
- Venue: Old Drill Hall
- Location: Cape Town, South Africa
- Type: Stamp exhibition

The South African Tercentenary International Stamp Exhibition or Suid Afrikaanse Driehonderdjaarfees Posseel Uitstalling (SATISE/SADIPU) was held in the Old Drill Hall, Cape Town from 26 March to 5 April 1952, organized by the Cape Town Philatelic Society and under the chairmanship of William Irving, F.R.P.S.L. Two stamps from the 1952 Van Riebeeck issue were overprinted for the exhibition. The 1d. (overprinted SATISE) and the 2d. (overprinted SADIPU) was issued on 26 March 1952.

== Palmares ==
The principal awards went to the following exhibits:

The Grand Prix and Cape of Good Hope Championship Trophy went to Capt. C. Emerson Huston for ‘Cape Triangulars, 1853-63’.

The Championship Award for Union Issues went to Sam Legator.

The R.P.S. Medal went to D. J. Klink for ‘Netherlands first issue’.

Gold Awards of Honour went to:

E. T. Hall for ‘Cape Triangulars’; Arthur V. Jacob for ‘Rhodesia’; H. V. Farmer for ‘Seychelles’; W. E. Lea for ‘Great Britain’; H. C. Baldus for ‘Prussian Postal History’; D. J. Klink for ‘Netherlands first issue’; L. E. Dawson for ‘India, 1852-55’; Col. A E. Stewart for ‘India, ½ Anna & 1 Anna’; H. W. Hurlock (2 awards) for ‘Barbados’ & ‘Trinidad’; John H. Sinton for ‘St. Vincent’.

There were also 10 Golds, 18 Vermeils, 25 Silvers & 29 Bronze medals awarded and in the junior section, 2 Silver and 4 bronze medals were awarded. A Special Prize was given to Ernest Hunt for a World collection.

== See also ==
List of philatelic exhibitions (by country)
