= Eduardo Cohen =

Portuguese philatelist

Eduardo Cohen (1890 – 1963) was a Romanian-born Portuguese philatelist who was added to the Roll of Distinguished Philatelists in 1959.
