= Yamil H. Kouri Jr. =

American philatelist

- Occupation: Philatelist
- Organization: Postal History Society (President)
- Known for: Philately; Postal history research
- Awards: Roll of Distinguished Philatelists (2020); Benjamin and Naomi Wishnietsky World Series Champion of Champions Award (2019); Luff Award for Exceptional Contributions to Philately (2020)

Yamil H. Kouri Jr. is an American philatelist who signed the Roll of Distinguished Philatelists in 2020. He serves as President of the Postal History Society.

In 2019, he won the Benjamin and Naomi Wishnietsky World Series Champion of Champions Award at the 2019 American Philatelic Society Stampshow in Omaha, Nebraska.

In 2020, he received the Luff Award for Exceptional Contributions to Philately.
