= Gerald Wellburn =

Canadian philatelist

Gerald E. Wellburn (1900 – 25 May 1992) was a Canadian philatelist who was added to the Roll of Distinguished Philatelists in 1951. Wellburn was a specialist in the stamps of British Columbia and Vancouver Island.
