= Penny Black =

World's first adhesive postage stamp

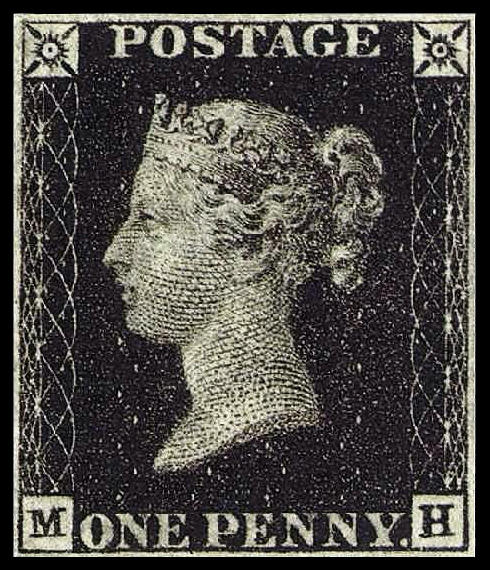
- Type: Definitive postage stamp
- Country of issue: United Kingdom
- Date of issue: 1 May 1840 – February 1841
- Printer: Perkins Bacon, London, UK
- Perforation: None
- Depicts: Queen Victoria
- Notability: World's first adhesive postage stamp
- Nature of rarity: Classic stamp
- No. printed: 68,808,000
- No. in existence: c. 1,300,000
- Face value: 1 penny
- Estimated value: £40–£1000s (Note: Prices for good to fine used stamps range between approximately £40 and £400 as of 2019 (poor copies can cost less). Unused Penny Blacks sell for much more, with prices ranging from £1250 to hundreds of thousands of pounds.)

The Penny Black was the world's first adhesive postage stamp used in a public postal system. It was first issued in the United Kingdom on 1 May 1840 but was not valid for use until 6 May. The stamp features a profile of 21-year-old Queen Victoria.

In 1837, British postal rates were high, complex, and anomalous. To simplify matters, Sir Rowland Hill proposed an adhesive stamp to indicate pre-payment of postage. At the time it was normal for the recipient to pay postage on delivery, charged by the sheet and on distance travelled. By contrast, the Penny Black allowed letters of up to 1/2 ounce (14 grams) to be delivered at a flat rate of one penny, regardless of distance.

== Treasury competition ==
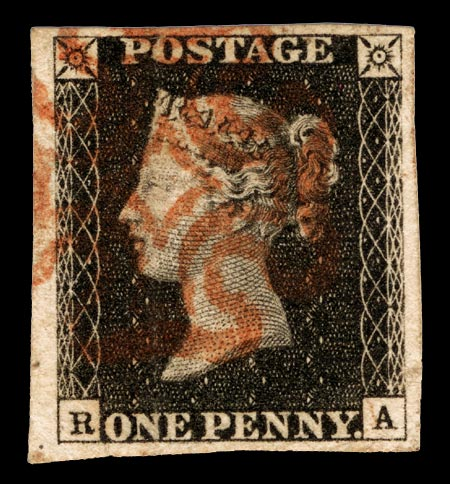
A Penny Black, with a red cancellation that was hard to see and easily removed

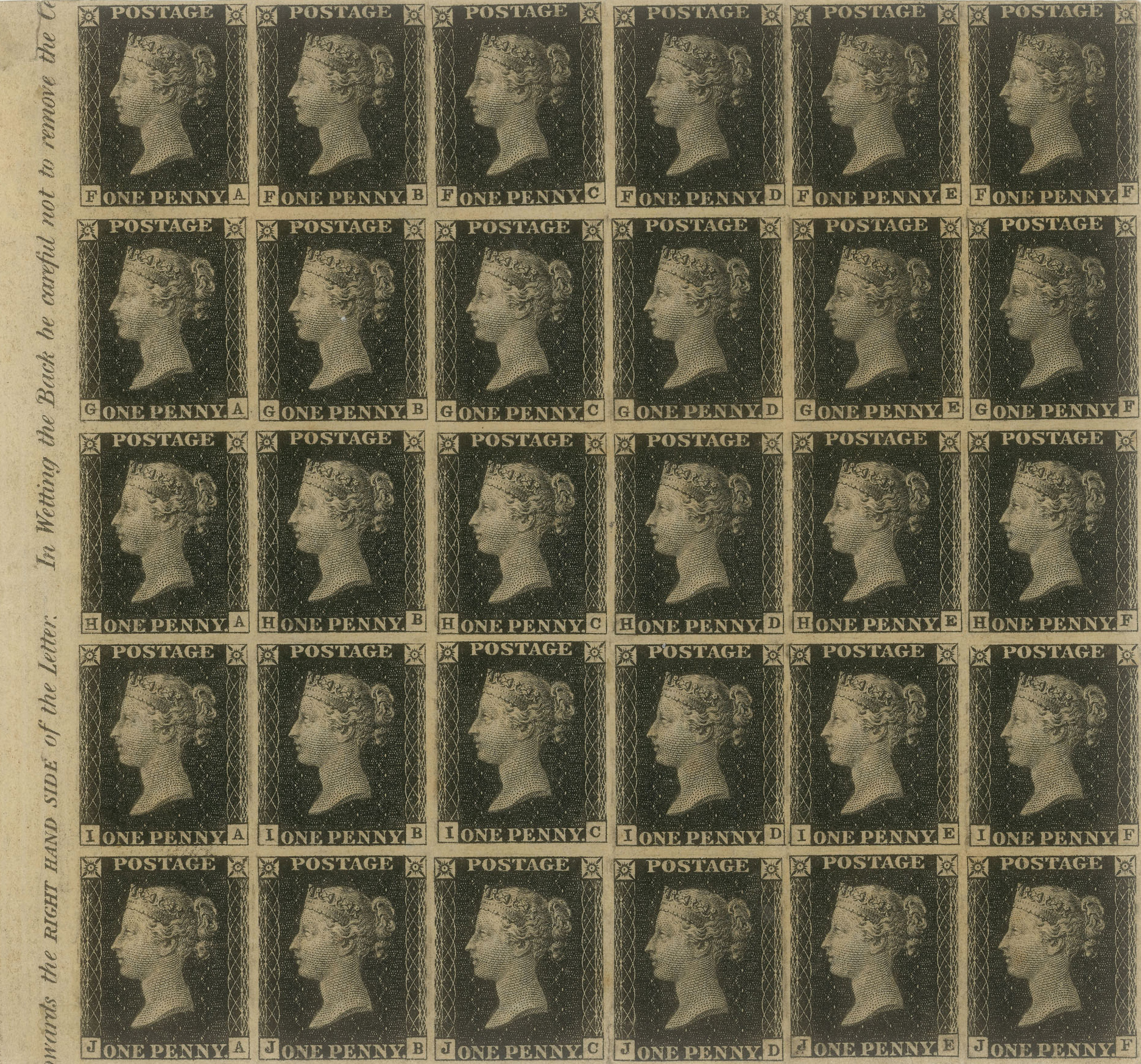
Large mint block of the Penny Black

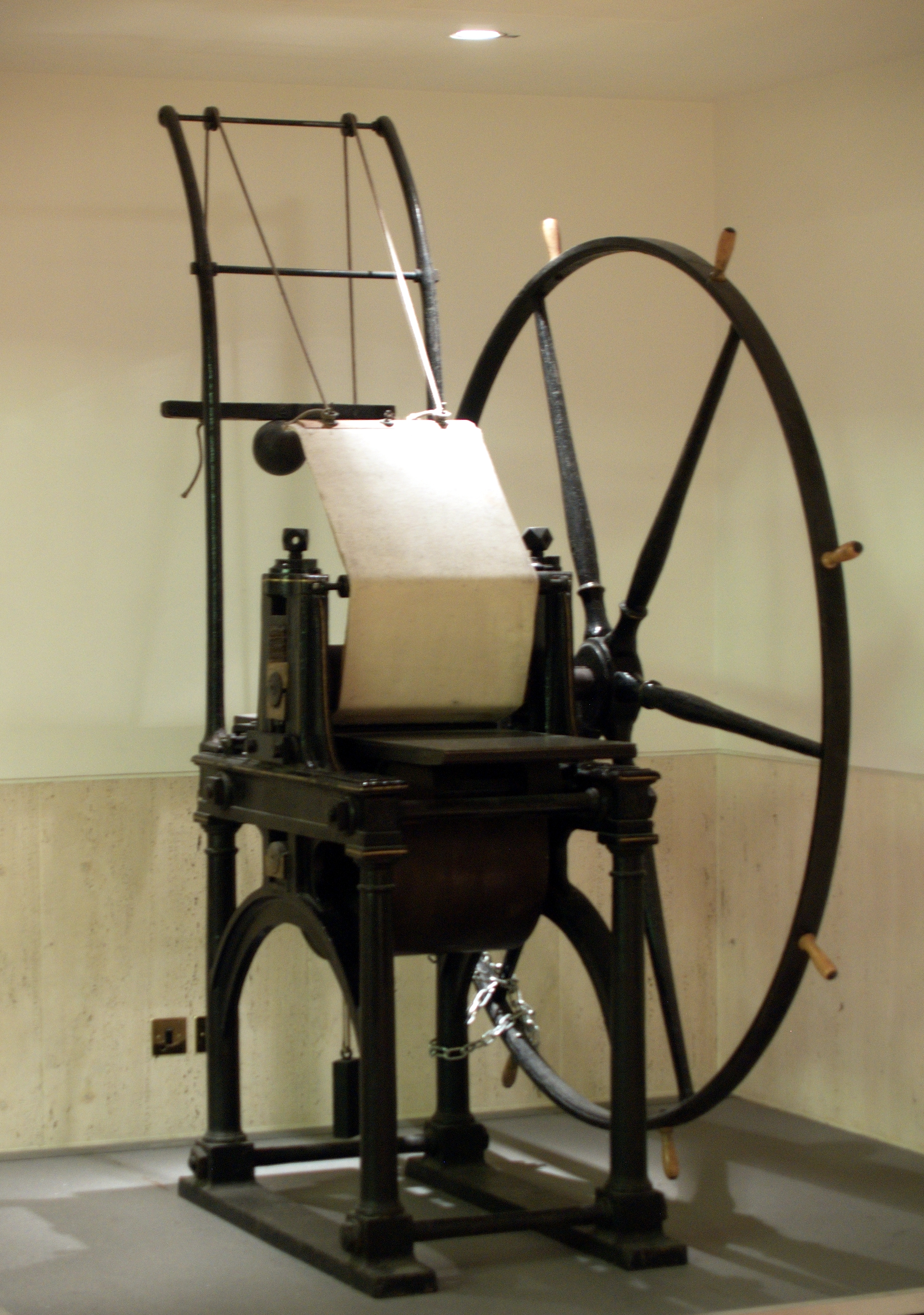
The Jacob Perkins' press, which printed the Penny Black and the 2d Blue, in the British Library Philatelic Collections

On 13 February 1837, Sir Rowland Hill proposed to a government enquiry both the idea of a pre-paid stamp and a pre-paid envelope, a separate sheet folded to form an enclosure for carrying letters. Hill was given a two-year contract to run the new system, and together with Henry Cole he announced a competition to design the stamps. Out of some 2,600 entries, none was considered suitable, however, so a rough design endorsed by Hill was chosen instead, featuring an easily recognisable profile of Queen Victoria. Hill believed this would be difficult to forge.

== Design ==
The portrait of Victoria was engraved by Charles Heath and his son Frederick, based on a sketch provided by Henry Corbould. Corbould's sketch was in turn based on the 1834 cameo-like head by William Wyon, which was used on a medal to commemorate the Queen's visit to the City of London in 1837. This portrait of Victoria remained on British stamps until her death in 1901. All British stamps still bear a portrait or silhouette of the monarch somewhere on the design. The first stamps did not need to show the issuing country, so no country name was included on them. The UK remains the only country in the world to omit its name on postage stamps; the monarch's image signifies the UK as the country of origin.

Initially, Hill specified that the stamps should be 3/4 inch square but altered the dimensions to 3/4 inch wide by 7/8 inch tall (approx 19 x 22 mm) to accommodate the writing at the bottom. The word "POSTAGE" at the top of the design distinguishes it from a revenue stamp which had long been used in the UK; "ONE PENNY." at the bottom shows the amount pre-paid for postage of the stamped letter.

The background to the portrait consists of finely engraved engine turnings. The two upper corners hold Maltese crosses with radiant solar discs at their centres; the lower corner letters show the position of the stamp in the printed sheet, from "A A" at top left to "T L" at bottom right. The sheets, printed by Perkins Bacon, consisted of 240 stamps in 20 rows of 12 columns. One full sheet cost 240 pence or one pound; one row of 12 stamps cost a shilling. As the name suggests, the stamp was printed in black ink. A two-penny stamp, the Two Penny Blue, printed in blue and covered the double-letter rate (up to 1 oz or 28 g), was issued on 8 May 1840.

== Issue ==
Although the stamps were not officially issued for sale until 6 May 1840, some offices such as those in Bath sold the stamps unofficially before that date. There are covers postmarked 2 May, and a single example is known on cover dated 1 May 1840. All London post offices received official supplies of the new stamps but other offices throughout the United Kingdom did not, continuing to accept payments for postage in cash for a period.

The Penny Black lasted less than a year. A red cancellation was difficult to see on the black design, and the red ink was easy to remove; both made it possible to re-use cancelled stamps. In February 1841, the treasury switched to the Penny Red and began using black ink for cancellations instead, which was more effective and difficult to remove. However, people still re-used stamps by combining the uncancelled parts of two stamps to form an unused whole, so in 1864 as a further safeguard the top corner stars on the Penny Red were replaced by the lower corner check letters in reverse order.

== Imprimatur sheet ==
Imprimatur sheets are from among the first sheets of stamps printed from a finished printing plate. The actual imprimatur ('let it be printed') refers to the written permission of the Inland Revenue officials entered on the back of the sheet of stamps. In the 19th century, it was common for officials to remove some stamps from each sheet to present as gifts to dignitaries and other important people. Individual stamps from an Imprimatur sheet can thus be found for sale on the open market.

A complete sheet of the Penny Black without check letters is held by the British Postal Museum. This unique item is in fact a plate proof and by definition not an imprimatur sheet.

== Printing ==
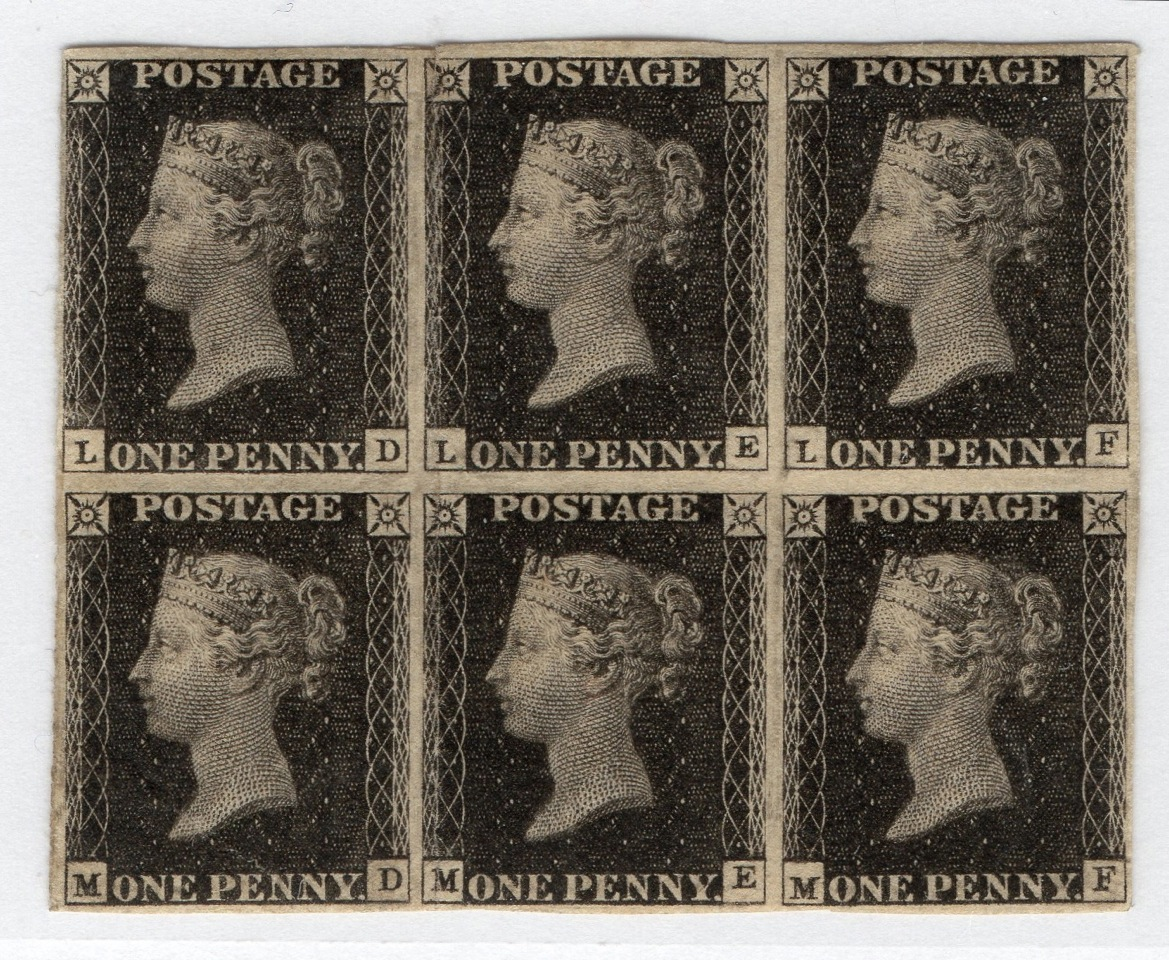
A mint block of six, plate 11

The Penny Black was printed from 11 plates, but as Plate 1 was completely overhauled after excessive wear, it is generally considered to be two separate plates, 1a and 1b. Plate 11 was originally intended solely for the printing of red stamps, but a small number were printed in black. These are scarce.

The stamps were printed in imperforate sheets, to be cut with scissors for sale and use. As a result, stamps with badly cut margins or no margins are common and worth very little, while examples with four clear margins are rare and expensive, especially if in mint condition.

An original printing press for the Penny Black, the "D" cylinder press invented by Jacob Perkins and patented in 1819, is on display at the British Library in London. The total print run was 286,700 sheets, containing a total of 68,808,000 stamps. Many were saved, and in used condition they remain readily available to stamp collectors. The only known complete sheets of the Penny Black are owned by the British Postal Museum.

== VR official ==
In addition to the general issue of the Penny Black, a similar stamp intended for official mail was produced, with the letters "V" and "R" replacing the crosses in the top corners. Because the general public quickly accepted the postage stamps and ridiculed the Mulready stationery produced at the same time, vast supplies of Mulready letter sheets were given for official use to government departments such as the tax office, and the idea of introducing an official stamp was abandoned. Only a few postally used examples exist, which probably originate from the Post Office circulars sent out as advance notice of the new stamps. Four are known on covers; all were cut from their envelopes and then replaced. Most of the cancelled examples are from trials of cancellation types, inks, and experiments with their removal. Those trials led to the change from black to red stamps, and vice versa for the cancellations.

== In popular culture ==
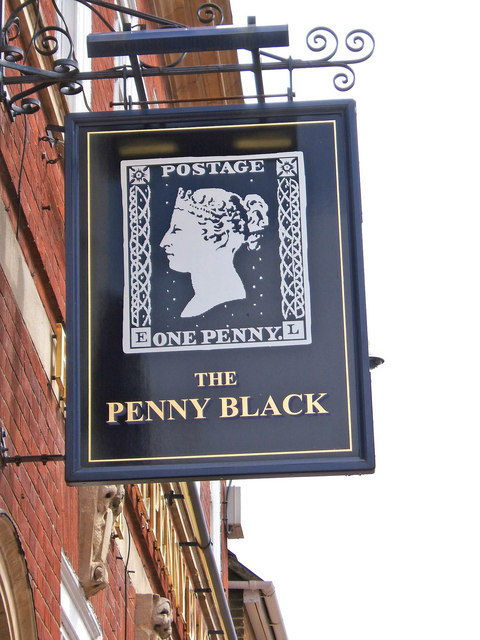
The pub sign of the Penny Black, formerly a post office, in Bicester, Oxfordshire

Considered a British cultural icon, the Penny Black design featured in the innovations section of the series B British passport issued in 2015. Also in 2015, the search engine Google marked the 175th anniversary of the postage stamp with a Google doodle of the Penny Black.

The boardgame Penny Black features the stamp. A small number of Penny Black stamps are available for the player to earn. Players are able to score points if stamps of the same colour are surrounding the Penny Black.

The development of the Penny Black is depicted in Daisy Goodwin's Victoria, Season 1 Episode 3.

The Penny Black plays a prominent role in the novel, The Sweetness at the Bottom of the Pie, by Alan Bradley.

== See also ==
- List of British postage stamps
- List of notable postage stamps
- Mauritius "Post Office"
- Postage stamps and postal history of Great Britain
- Stamp Centenary Exhibition 1940
- Uniform Penny Post
