= Philatelic exhibition =

Exhibition of stamps and postal history

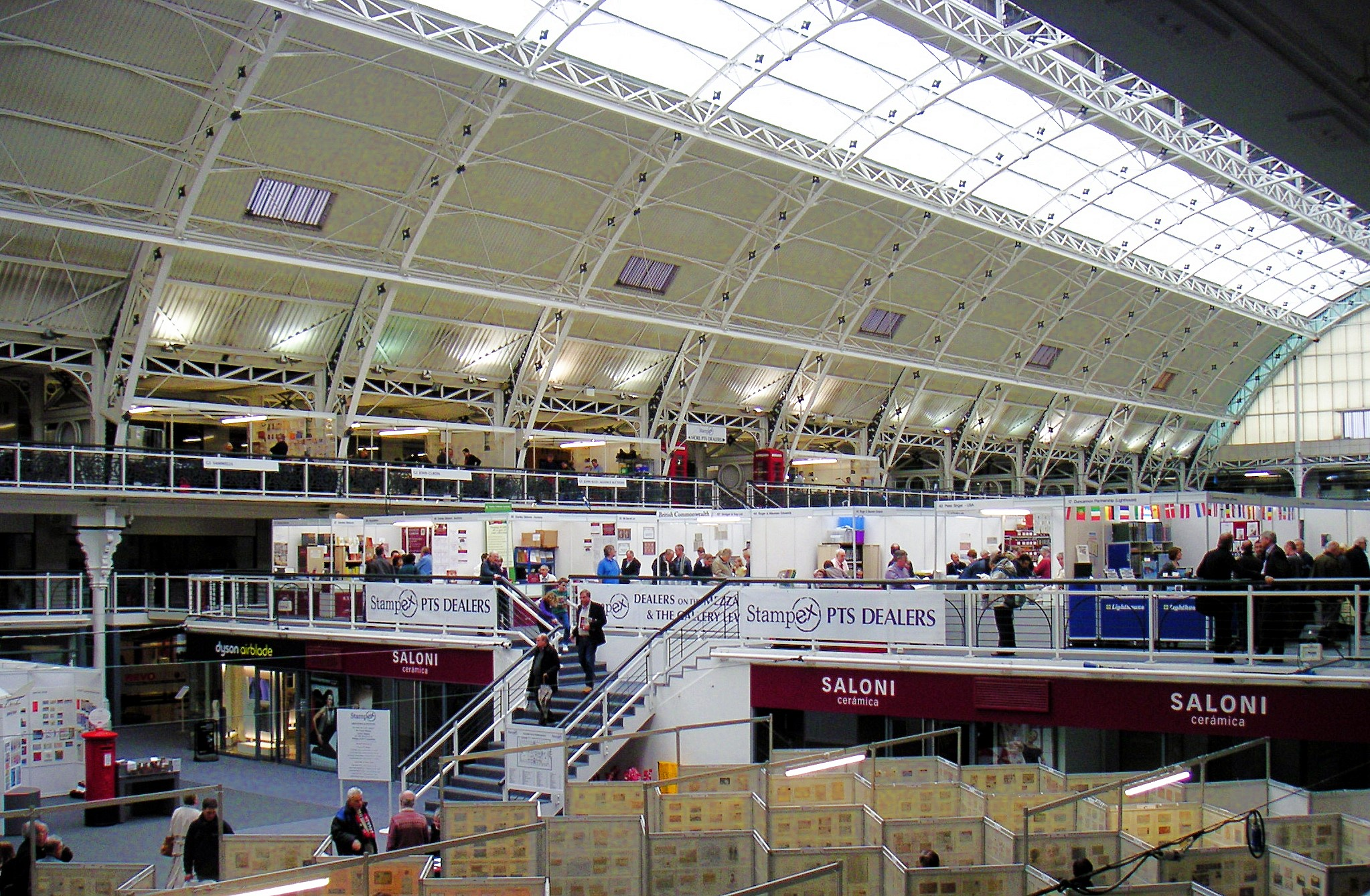
The London Stampex show is held each Spring and Autumn

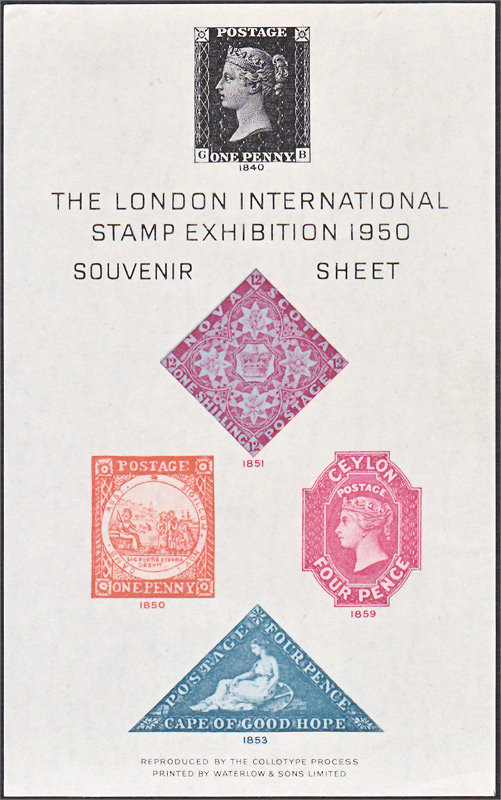
A non-postal souvenir sheet for the London International Stamp Exhibition 1950

A philatelic exhibition is an exhibition of stamps and postal history where stamp collectors (philatelists) compete for medals. The displays are shown in glass frames, and the exhibition is normally accompanied by stamp dealer bourses and post office stands where stamps and other philatelic items may be purchased.

Many philatelic exhibitions are regular events, held annually or at some other frequency and they are important events in the philatelic calendar.

== Types of exhibition ==
Exhibitions are normally of international, national, regional or local scope. They may also be for specific collecting interests, for instance the Eurothema exhibition for thematic collecting.

The most prestigious international exhibitions are those for which Fédération Internationale de Philatélie (FIP) patronage is granted, although the increasing cost of complying with FIP requirements has caused concern with some exhibition organisers, particularly in the developing world.

== Classes of exhibit ==
Exhibits are shown in different classes. Normally the classes are similar to those of the FIP Commissions:

- Aerophilately
- Astrophilately
- Fight against Forgeries
- Maximaphily
- Philatelic literature
- Postal history
- Postal stationery
- Thematic philately
- Traditional philately
- Revenues
- Youth philately

Not all classes are shown at every exhibition as exhibits and jurors may not be available. In addition, exhibitions not endorsed by FIP may have different classes.

== Judging ==
Philatelic judging is done according to agreed criteria, and in the case of international exhibitions the rules of the FIP are normally used. Judges need to be accredited by the FIP in order to be qualified to judge at FIP endorsed exhibitions.

Judging is a skill in its own right for which training is required.

== Prizes ==
The judges award a variety of prizes, including gold, vermeil and silver medals and other prizes as determined by the exhibition officials.

== Souvenirs ==
It is common for commemorative covers and souvenir sheets to be produced for the larger exhibitions and these are a recognised collecting specialism in themselves.

== See also ==
- List of philatelic exhibitions (by country)
