= Fédération Internationale de Philatélie =

World federation for philately based in Zürich, Switzerland

Logo of the FIP

The Fédération Internationale de Philatélie (FIP) is the world federation for philately (the study of postage stamps and postal history). Based in Zürich, Switzerland, the FIP was founded on 18 June 1926.

== Aims ==
The FIP was founded in 1926 when a small number of European federations came together to found a worldwide organisation. The FIP promotes stamp collecting and philately. The FIP works to promote philately in developing countries, in Asia and in industrialised countries, where it appears to be stagnating. It coordinates contact between philatelic organisations in different countries. Every year the FIP provides patronage to a number of major stamp exhibitions. The FIP Congress takes place annually during one of the international exhibitions that it has endorsed.

In 2004, FIP ran its first "World Stamp Competition" in Singapore and selected Tel Aviv for the second competition in 2008. The competitions involved national teams and philatelic jurors. In 2008, FIP selected Tel Aviv, Paris, Bucharest, Prague, and Vienna for stamp exhibitions.

== Governance ==
The FIP is run by a board of directors with a president and three vice-presidents. Since 2010, the president has been Bernard Beston, of Australia.

== Commissions ==
There are eleven FIP Commissions which deal with the following subjects:

- Aerophilately
- Astrophilately
- Fight against Forgeries
- Maximaphily
- Philatelic literature
- Postal history
- Postal stationery
- Thematic philately
- Traditional philately
- Revenues
- Youth philately

== See also ==
- International Philatelic Union
- La Federación Interamericana de Filatelia
