= Thailand Post =

National postal service

- Native name: ไปรษณีย์ไทย
- Company type: Government-owned
- Industry: Postal service
- Predecessor: Communications Authority of Thailand
- Founded: 4 August 1883; 142 years ago
- Headquarters: Lak Si, Bangkok
- Area served: Thailand
- Key people: Danan Suphatthaphan(President)
- Revenue: ▲27.8 billion baht (2017)
- Net income: ▲4.2 billion baht (2017)
- Owner: Ministry of Digital Economy and Society
- Number of employees: 24,000
- Website: Official website

Thailand Post (THP) (Thai: ไปรษณีย์ไทย, RTGS: Praisani Thai), formerly part of the Communications Authority of Thailand until 2003, is a state enterprise that provides postal services in Thailand.

The Post and Telegraph Office was first established in 1883 by King Rama V. Its first post office was in a large building by the Chao Phraya River, on the north side of the Ong-Ang Canal. In 1898, by merging with the Telegraph Department, its name was changed to "Department of Mail and Telegraph". The department was abolished in 1977 and the country's mailing and telegraphing was assumed by the new government-owned company, "Communications Authority of Thailand" (CAT). In 2003, the government separated the communications authority into two companies, "Thailand Post" and "CAT Telecom".

== History ==
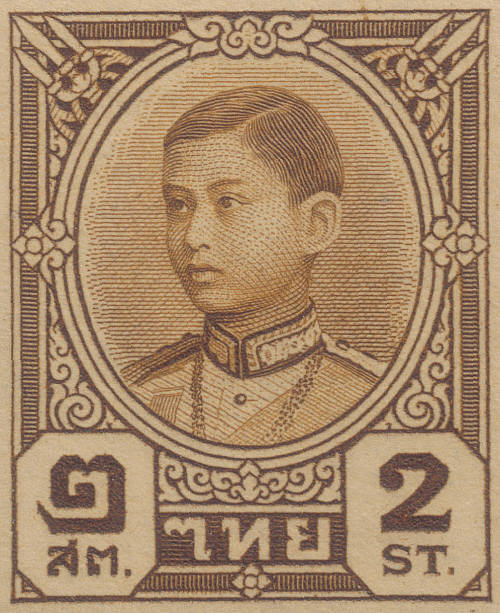
A 1941 Thai stamp for King Ananda Mahidol

Prior to the operation of Thailand Post, there was limited mail service, mainly for the royal family. Traditionally, messages between the government in Bangkok and provincial outposts had been carried by a herald or by fast boat. During the reign of King Chulalongkorn (r. 1868–1910), the Ministry of Interior maintained a schedule which specified that messages between Bangkok and Nong Khai took 12 days, between Bangkok and Ubon Ratchathani, 12 days, and between Bangkok and Luang Prabang, 17 days outbound and 13 days inbound. Domestic mail traveled by messengers while international mail traveled by steamboat to post offices in nearby countries, such as the Straits Settlements.

The earliest recorded mail from Bangkok dates back to 1836 when American missionary Dan Beach Bradley sent a letter to his father in a stampless cover. The British Consular Post Office in Bangkok was established by Great Britain in 1858 as a consequence of the Bowring Treaty signed between Great Britain and Siam (now Thailand) on 18 April 1855, in response to a demand by expatriate merchants and missionaries. It ceased to provide service on 1 July 1885, the day Siam joined the Universal Postal Union and started its own international postal service. During that time most of the mail from Bangkok was sent by diplomatic pouch to Singapore for forwarding. On 4 August 1883, the first stamp was issued in Siam.

== Financials ==
In 2016 Thailand Post reported a net profit of 3.5 billion baht on revenues of 25 billion baht in 2016, up from 22 billion in 2015. It projects revenue of 26.9 billion baht with a net profit of 3.3 billion baht in 2017. The enterprise employs 24,000 persons nationwide. The company has 19 logistics centers and 1,300 post offices nationwide.

Thailand Post's results for 2017 included 27.8 billion baht in revenue, up eight percent over 2016, and a net profit of 4.2 billion baht, up 18 percent. The company projects total revenue for 2018 at more than 30.8 billion baht with double-digit growth in net profit again.

Thailand Post expects 2018 revenue to be 30.8 billion baht and is already forecasting 2019's profit to be five billion baht. The increases are due to the success of e-commerce. Among Thai retailers, eBay is the most used site for international e-commerce. More than 10,000 Thais use eBay to sell their goods.

== Infrastructure ==
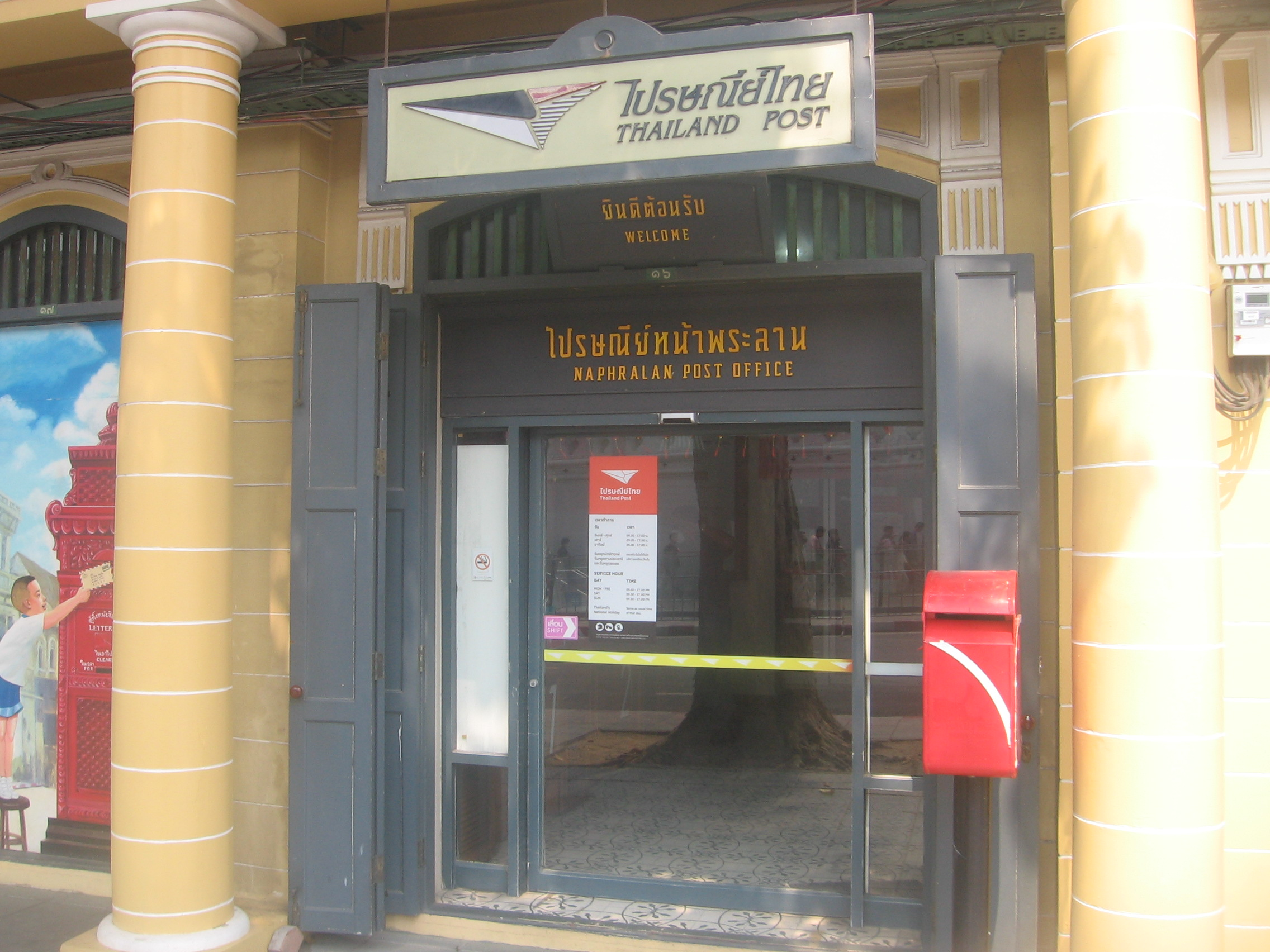
Thailand Post Naphralan Post Office

THP has 19 logistical centers across the country, 1,300 post offices, and 3,300 post office licensees. In 2018 it allocated 10 billion baht to construct two new automated sorting centers, one in Chonburi Province and the other in Wang Noi District, Ayutthaya Province. Its goal is to fully automate postal and delivery operations as well as back office procedures by 2021.

== See also ==
- List of national postal services
- Postage stamps and postal history of Bangkok
- Postage stamps and postal history of Thailand
- Row Collection
