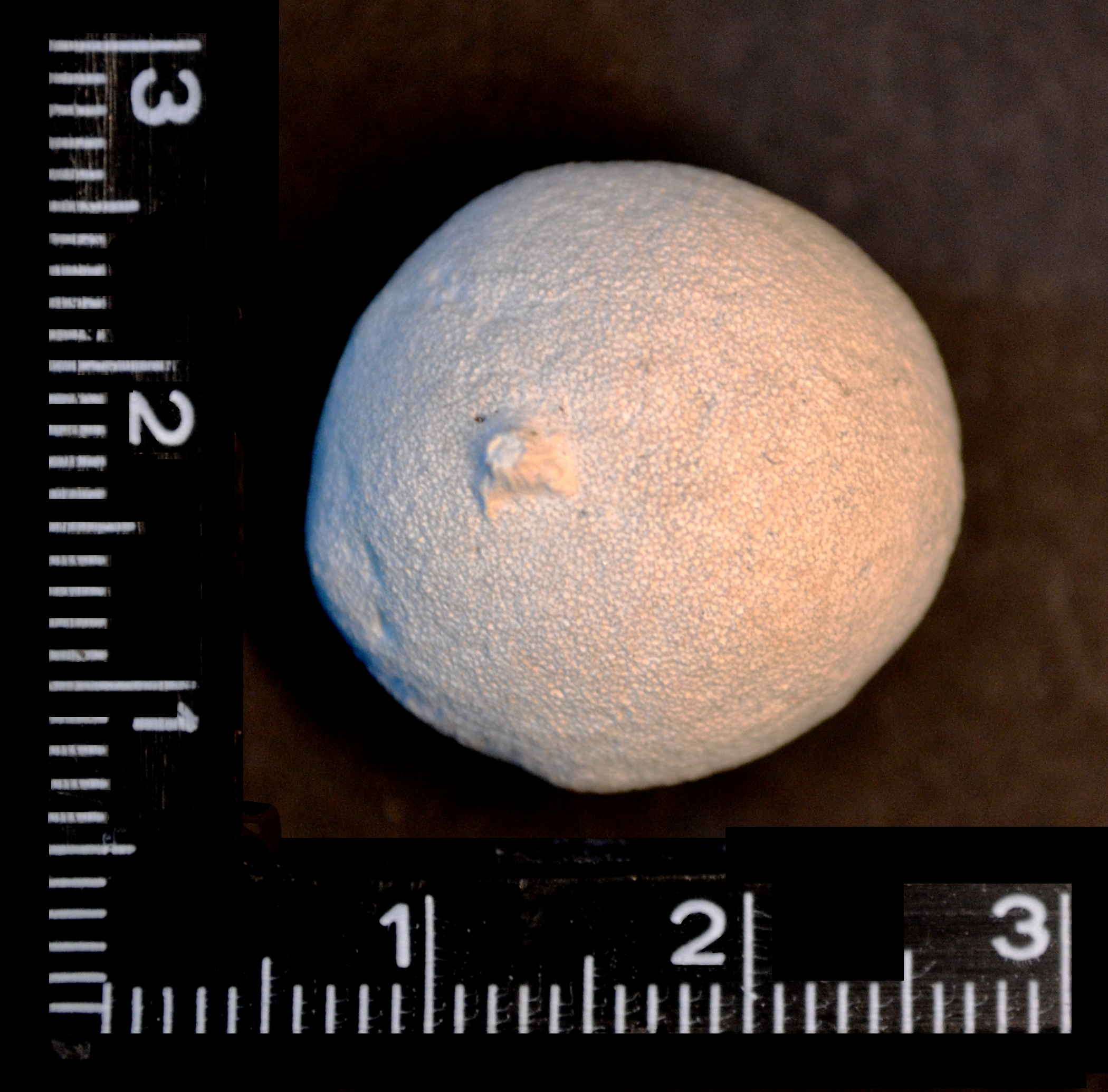
- Porosphaera globularis fossil from the Cretaceous of Germany

Scientific classification
- Kingdom: Animalia
- Phylum: Porifera
- Class: Calcarea
- Order: Lithonida; Vacelet, 1981
- Family: Minchinellidae; Dendy & Row, 1913

Genera
- see text.

Synonyms
- Bactronellidae Laubenfels, 1955; Petrostomidae Laubenfels, 1936; Porosphaeridae Laubenfels, 1955

= Minchinellidae =

Minchinellidae Temporal range: Jurassic–recent

Order of sponges

Minchinellidae is a family of calcareous sponges, members of the class Calcarea. It is the only family in the monotypic order Lithonida. The families Petrobionidae (genus Petrobiona) and Lepidoleuconidae (genus Lepidoleucon) have also sometimes been placed within Lithonida, though more recently they have been moved to the order Baerida. Thanks to their hypercalcified structure, minchinellids have a fossil record reaching as far back as the Jurassic Period.

== Description ==
Minchinellids are hypercalcified sponges. They have a robust skeleton of tetractine (four-rayed) calcareous spicules. The tetractine spicules are propeller-shaped, with three curved actines (rays) radiating perpendicular to a straight basal actine. These spicules may be linked by their basal actines or cemented together by calcite. The skeleton is reinforced with layers of loose diapason (tuning fork-shaped) spicules. Minchinellid sponges have a leuconoid canal system.

== List of genera ==
- †Bactronella Hinde, 1884 [Jurassic–Miocene, Holocene?]
- Minchinella Kirkpatrick, 1908 [Holocene]
- Monoplectroninia Pouliquen & Vacelet, 1970 [Holocene]
- †Muellerithalmia Reitner, 1987 [Upper Jurassic]
- Petrostroma Döderlein, 1892 [Cretaceous–Holocene]
- Plectroninia Hinde, 1900 [Jurassic?, Cretaceous–Holocene]
- †Porosphaera Steinmann, 1878 [Cretaceous]
- †Porosphaerella Welter, 1911 [Cretaceous]
- †Retispinopora Brydone, 1912 [Cretaceous–Paleocene]
- †Sagittularia Welter, 1911 [Cretaceous]
- Tulearinia Vacelet, 1977 [Holocene]
