= Leucopsila =

Scientific classification
- Kingdom: Animalia
- Phylum: Porifera
- Class: Calcarea
- Order: Baerida
- Family: Baeriidae
- Genus: Leucopsila; Dendy & Row, 1913

Type species
- Leuconia stilifera Schmidt, 1870

Species
- Leucopsila hexactina Sanamyan, Sanamyan, Kukhlevskiy & Shilov, 2023; Leucopsila pacifica Sanamyan, Sanamyan, Kukhlevskiy & Shilov, 2023; Leucopsila stilifera (Schmidt, 1870)

Genus of sponges

Leucopsila is a genus of poriferans in the family Baeriidae, was originally described as Leuconia stylifera in 1870. The genus was described by Dendy & Row in 1913.
