= Syconessa =

Scientific classification
- Kingdom: Animalia
- Phylum: Porifera
- Class: Calcarea
- Order: Leucosolenida
- Family: Heteropiidae
- Genus: Syconessa; Borojevic, Boury-Esnault & Vacelet, 2000

Genus of sponges

Syconessa is a genus of sponges in the family Heteropiidae.

Species:

- Syconessa panicula Wörheide & Hooper, 2003
- Syconessa syconiformis (Borojevic, 1967)
