= Borojevia aspina =

Scientific classification
- Kingdom: Animalia
- Phylum: Porifera
- Class: Calcarea
- Order: Clathrinida
- Family: Clathrinidae
- Genus: Borojevia
- Species: B. aspina

Binomial name
- Borojevia aspina (Klautau, Solé-Cava and Borojevic, 1994)

Synonyms
- Clathrina aspina Klautau, Solé-Cava and Borojevic, 1994

Species of sponge

Borojevia aspina is a species of calcareous sponge from Brazil. The species name refers to the lack of spines in the apical actine.

== Description ==
Massive cormus formed of thin, regular and tightly anastomosed tubes similar to those of Borojevia brasiliensis and Borojevia cerebrum. Oscula are simple apertures surrounded by a thin membrane. They are located on top of conical projections distributed throughout the cormus and receive the excurrent water from water-collecting tubes. In preserved specimens, it is difficult to recognise the oscula.

The skeleton has no special organisation, and it comprises triactines, tetractines and tripods. Triactines and tetractines are equiangular and equiradiate; their actines are slightly conical, with blunt tips. Triactines are the most abundant spicules; the apical actine is shorter and thinner than the facial ones. It is also straight, conical, and unlike that of B. brasiliensis and B. cerebrum, smooth. Occasionally, it is possible to find apical actines with vestigial spines. Tripods are typical, with a raised centre and conical actines but sometimes they are only similar to large conical triactines. They are distributed on a monolayer on the external tubes, delimiting the cormus. B. aspina has a sciaphile habitat.
