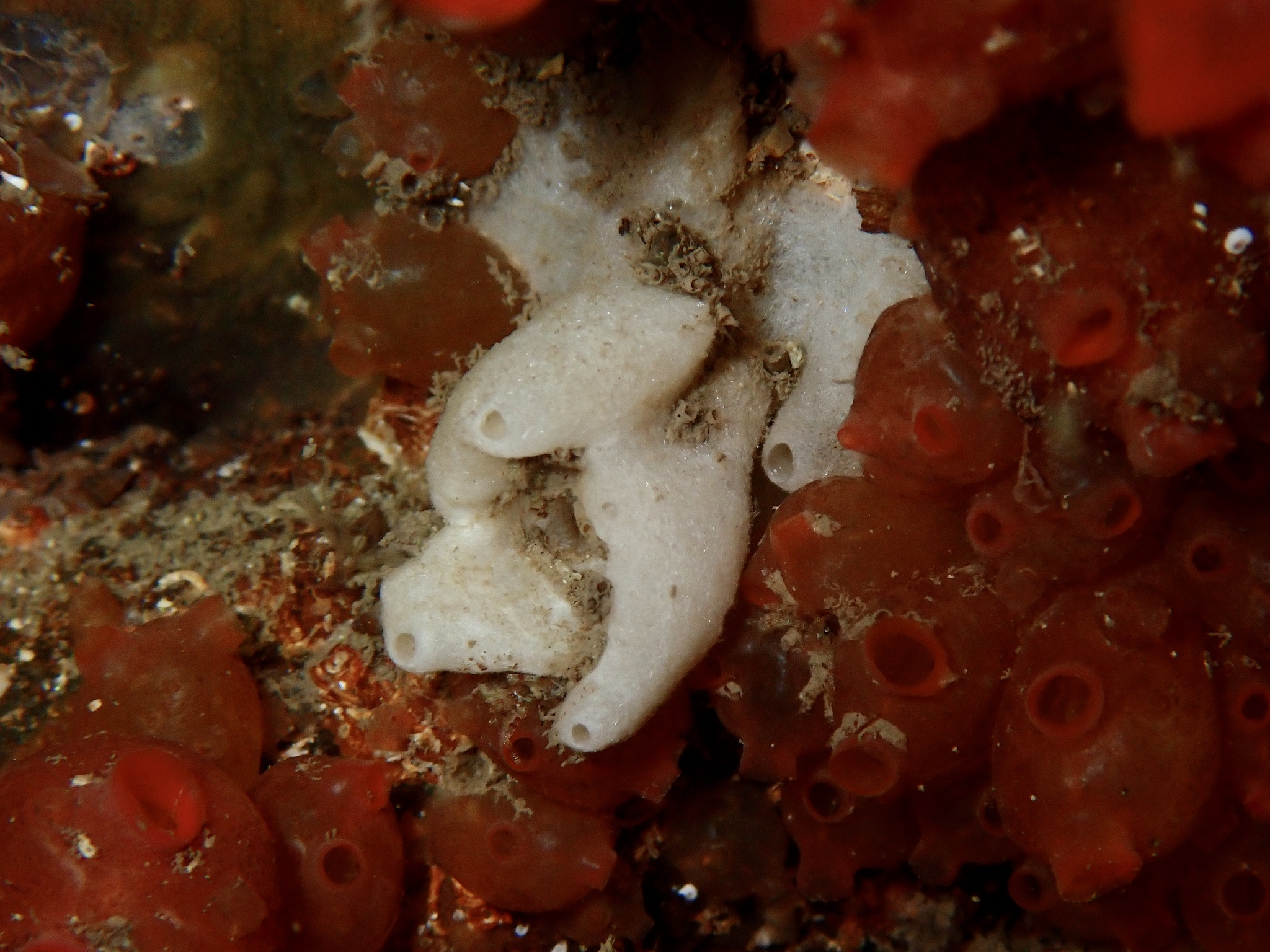

Scientific classification
- Kingdom: Animalia
- Phylum: Porifera
- Class: Calcarea
- Order: Baerida
- Family: Baeriidae
- Genus: Leuconia
- Species: L. nivea

Binomial name
- Leuconia nivea (Grant, 1826)

= Leuconia nivea =

Species of sponge

Leuconia nivea is a species of sea sponge in the family Baeriidae.
