= Trichogypsiidae =

Scientific classification
- Kingdom: Animalia
- Phylum: Porifera
- Class: Calcarea
- Order: Baerida
- Family: Trichogypsiidae; Borojevic, Boury-Esnault & Vacelet, 2000

Family of sponges

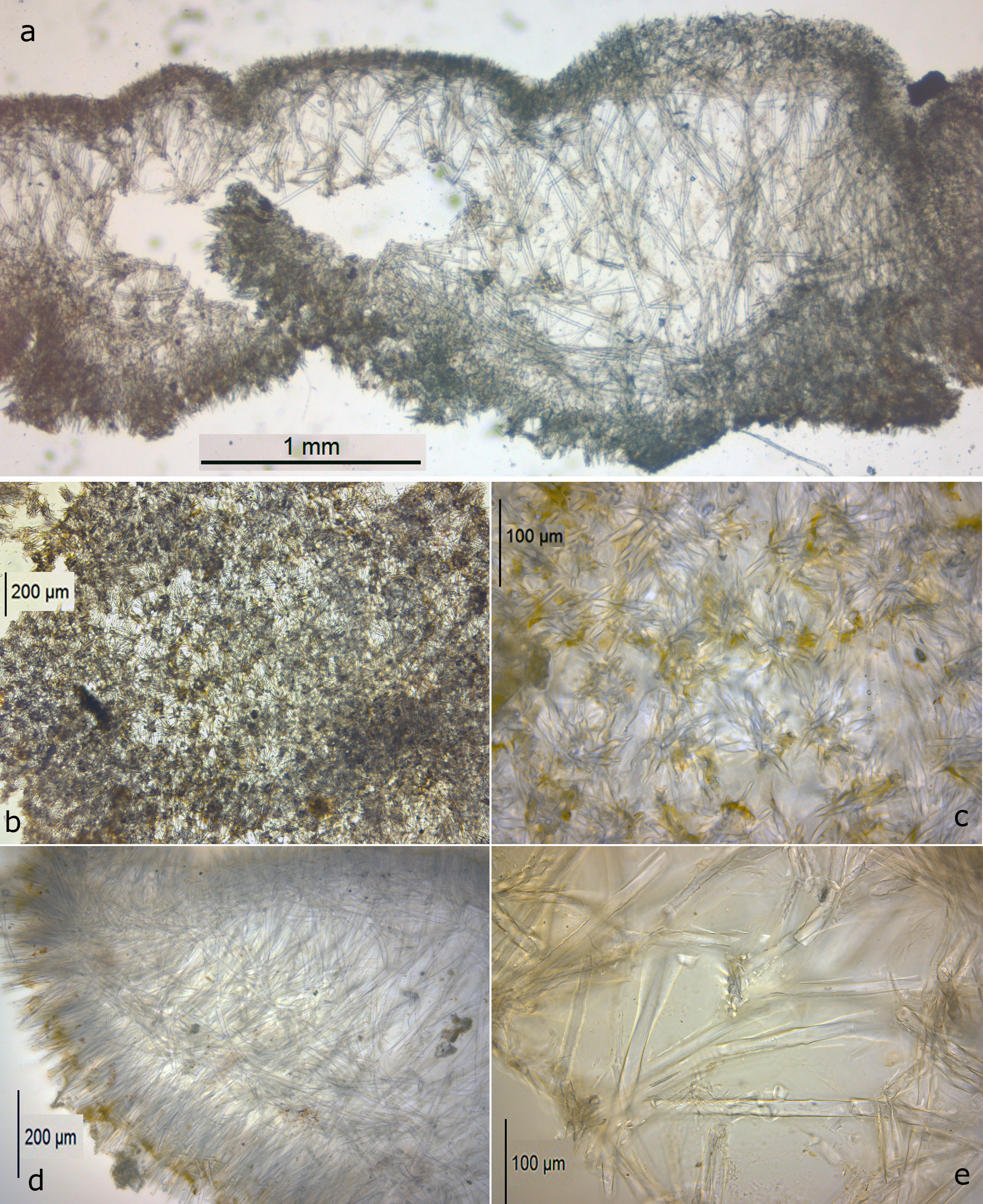
Microscopic views of Trichogypsia specimen (slide ZMA.POR.P1616) from the Seychelles. (a) Cross-section; (b) Surface overview; (c) Detail of bouquet cortical diactines; (d) Cross-section of peripheral and choanosomal skeleton; (e) Detail of choanosomal skeleton.

Trichogypsiidae is a family of sponges in the class Calcarea.

== Genera ==
- Kuarrhaphis Dendy & Row, 1913
- Leucyssa Haeckel, 1872
- Trichogypsia Carter, 1871
