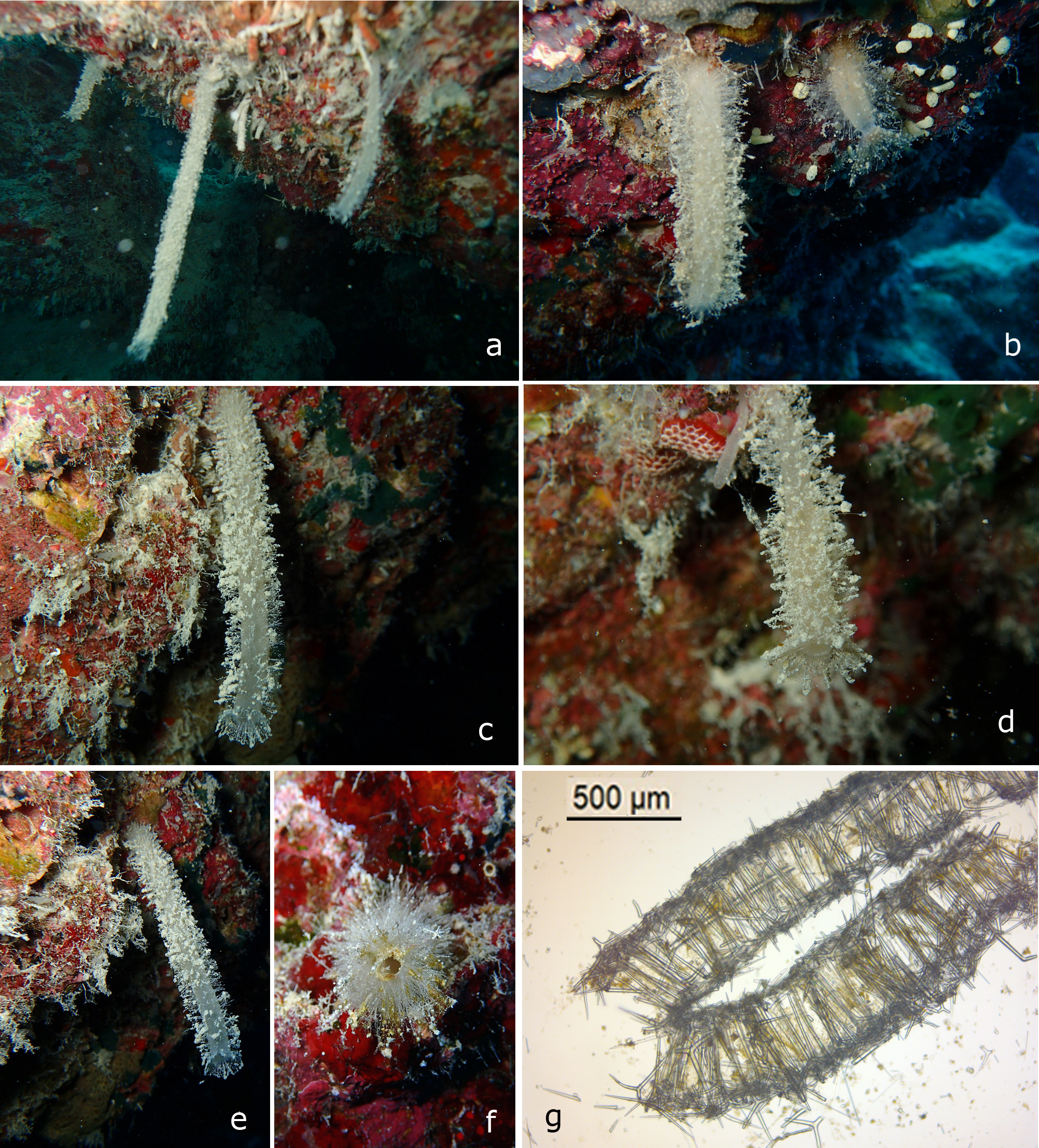

Scientific classification
- Kingdom: Animalia
- Phylum: Porifera
- Class: Calcarea
- Order: Leucosolenida
- Family: Heteropiidae
- Genus: Sycettusa
- Species: S. hastifera

Binomial name
- Sycettusa hastifera Row, 1909

= Sycettusa hastifera =

Species of sponge

Sycettusa hastifera is a species of sponge in the genus Sycettusa.
