= Kuarrhaphis =

Scientific classification
- Kingdom: Animalia
- Phylum: Porifera
- Class: Calcarea
- Order: Baerida
- Family: Trichogypsiidae
- Genus: Kuarrhaphis; Dendy & Row, 1913
- Species: K. cretacea

Binomial name
- Kuarrhaphis cretacea (Haeckel, 1872)

Synonyms
- (Species): Leucyssa cretacea Haeckel, 1872

Genus of sponges

Kuarrhaphis is a genus of calcareous sponges in the family Trichogypsiidae. It consists of one species, Kuarrhaphis cretacea.
