= Prakaipet Indhusophon =

Thai philatelist

Prakaipet Indhusophon (1929–1991) was a Thai philatelist who was added to the Roll of Distinguished Philatelists in 1989.

Indhusophon was an expert in the philately of classic Siam, and has received Large Gold medals (and Special Prizes) at Ausipex 84, Philakorea 84, Israphil 85 and Italia 85. He competed at the FIP Championship Class at Stockholmia 86, Capcx 87, Finlandia 88 and Praga 88. He won the Grand Prix d'Honneur in an FIP Championship Class of 29 entries.

He was married to Boonkrong Indhusophon, who continued his work after his death in April 1991.
