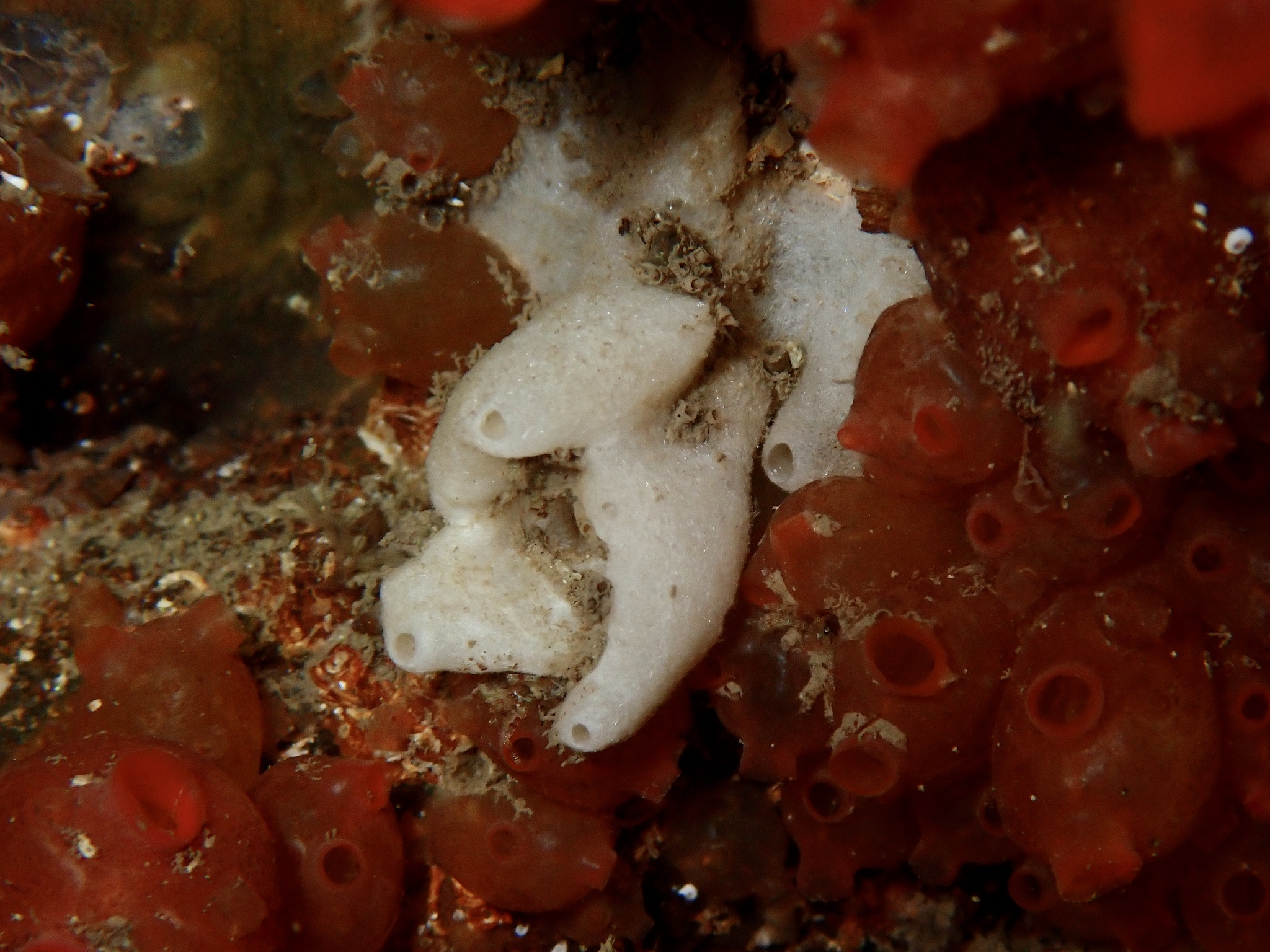

Scientific classification
- Kingdom: Animalia
- Phylum: Porifera
- Class: Calcarea
- Order: Baerida
- Family: Baeriidae; Borojevic, Boury-Esnault & Vacelet, 2000

Genera
- See text

Synonyms
- Leuconidae Vosmaer, 1887; Leuconiinae sensu De Laubenfels, 1936

= Baeriidae =

Family of sponges

Baeriidae is a family of calcareous sponges in the class Calcarea. It was named by Borojevic, Boury-Esnault, and Vacelet in 2000. The type genus is Baeria Miklucho-Maclay, 1870, by original designation, though Baeria is now considered a junior synonym of Leuconia Grant, 1833.

== Genera ==
The following genera are in the family Baeriidae:

- Eilhardia Poléjaeff, 1883
- Lamontia Kirk, 1895
- Leuconia Grant, 1833
- Leucopsila Dendy & Row, 1913
