= Vosmaeropsis macera =

Scientific classification
- Kingdom: Animalia
- Phylum: Porifera
- Class: Calcarea
- Order: Leucosolenida
- Family: Heteropiidae
- Genus: Vosmaeropsis
- Species: V. macera

Binomial name
- Vosmaeropsis macera ( Carter, 1886)

Synonyms
- Heteropia macera Carter, 1886; Vosmaeropsis dendyi Row & Hôzawa, 1931

Species of sponge

Lectotype site (Port Phillip Heads)

Vosmaeropsis macera is a species of calcareous sponge in the family Heteropiidae, and was first described in 1886 by Henry John Carter as Heteropia macera, and was later described as Vosmaeropsisis dendyi by Row and Hôzawa in 1931. It is the type species of the genus, Vosmaeropsis. The species epithet, macera, comes from the Latin, macer ("thin, meagre").

== Description ==
Carter described Heteropia macera as

""Agglomerate. Consisting of several individuals united together, whose form separately would be cylindrical, sacciform, and peristomed. Colour whitish yellow outside, sponge-brown within. Surface even, uniformly consisting of moderately large triradiates fixed in position by cribriform sarcode. Pores, the holes of the cribriform structure, which are very distinct but not particularly large. Vents of the individuals respectively terminal, circular, and each provided with a peristome, leading into a general cloacal cavity, which is narrow and cylindrical at first, but afterwards becomes wider than the wall of this cavity as it spreads itself out into the cloacal dilatations of the rest of the individuals in the mass; lioles of the cloaca large generally, but still variable in size and distance apart, corresponding with the variable width of the skeletal structure of the surface of the cloaca. Structure of the wall like that of the last species described, viz. H. patulosculifera, that is, consisting of horizontal intervals defined by the long shafts of sagittal triradiates which, coming from opposite sides of the wall, overlap each other, while the intervals, which are chiefly composed of sarcode, intercommunicate with each other by large holes in addition to the usual pores. Spicules of two kinds, viz. acerate and triradiate; no quadriradiates : — 1, acerates, of three forms, viz. that usually composing the peristome, among which proximally may be found shorter ones with lanciform ends; minute ones or mortar-spicules, both straight and sinuous, the latter with lanceolate ends, varying under 30-6000ths in. long, with which the cribriform structure of the surface is more or less charged; and, lastly, large and much curved fusiform acerates about 180 by 15-6000ths in., echinating the surface chiefly towards the mouth; 2, triradiates, of the surface generally, moderately large, regular and irregular, or sagittal; and of the wall much larger, where their shafts vary under 150 by 12-6000ths, with each of the arms a little less. No. 1, respectively, in its thin form confined to the peristome, in its minute one to the surface, where, in combination with the cribriform dermal sarcode, it fixes in the triradiates of this part: and the stouter form chiefly to the region of the mouth, where its much curved and thickened portion, which is outside, is directed towards this aperture, and its attenuated one sunk deeply into the wall of the specimen. No. 2, triradiates, to the dermal and cloacal surfaces and the wall; in the latter, their long straight shafts overlapping each other, as in the foregoing species, divide the structure into horizontal intervals, while their arms are much spread out sagitally under the spicular layers of the surface and of the cloaca. Size of largest group, for there are two specimens each consisting of several individuals of different size agglomerated, 2-3rds in. high by 1 1/2 x 1/2 in. horizontally.

Obs. In this species that peculiar form of the sagittal triradiate is well developed wherein the shaft, which is, as usual, straight and cylindrical, is accompanied by a vertically flattened state of the two arms; so that in situ, that is on the lower and inner part of the peristome, where this form of the triradiate is particularly evident, the shaft is seen to be in a line with the spicules or palisading of the peristome, while the flat arms are spread out sagittally across them — thus acting, like the cross bar of a paling, in keeping flat and in position the lower ends of the palisading."

== Distribution ==
In Australia, it is found in waters of the Bass Strait shelf, where occurs in waters with surface temperatures of 15 to 20 °C.
