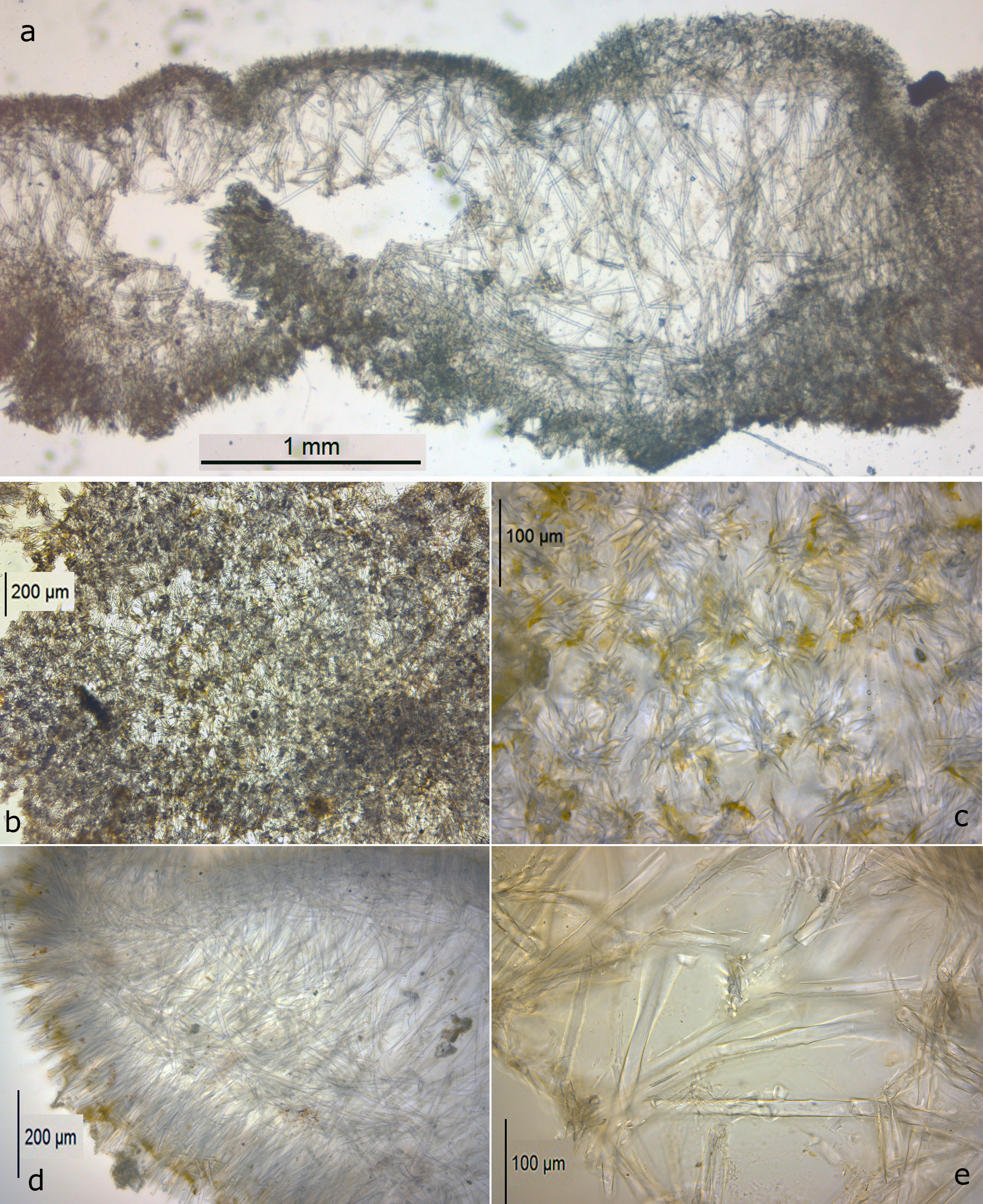
- Cross sections of Trichogypsia sp.

Scientific classification
- Kingdom: Animalia
- Phylum: Porifera
- Class: Calcarea
- Order: Baerida
- Family: Trichogypsiidae
- Genus: Trichogypsia; Carter, 1871

Type species
- Trichogypsia villosa Carter, 1871

Synonyms
- Sycolepis Haeckel, 1869 [nomen oblitum]

= Trichogypsia =

Genus of sponges

Trichogypsia is a genus of calcareous sponges in the order Baerida.

== Taxonomy ==
The following species are recognised in the genus Trichogypsia:

- Trichogypsia alaskensis Lehnert & Stone, 2017
- Trichogypsia incrustans (Haeckel, 1872)
- Trichogypsia villosa Carter, 1871
