= Borojevia paracerebrum =

Scientific classification
- Domain: Eukaryota
- Kingdom: Animalia
- Phylum: Porifera
- Class: Calcarea
- Order: Clathrinida
- Family: Clathrinidae
- Genus: Borojevia
- Species: B. paracerebrum

Binomial name
- Borojevia paracerebrum (Austin, 1996)

Synonyms
- Clathrina paracerebrum Austin, 1996

Species of sponge

Borojevia paracerebrum is a species of calcareous sponge from Mexico. The species is named after its similarity to Borojevia cerebrum.

== Description ==
The single known specimen was found encrusting on a specimen of Euryspongia rosea. It is ramose, with a smooth surface and is 3 to 4 cm in extent and up to 6 mm thick. The tightly woven anastomosing tubes are 100-180 μm in diameter. The approximately circular openings on the surface are 100-200 μm in diameter. Oscula have not been clearly identified. Large triactines and a few large tetractines occur in the choanosome. Approximately a third of the small tetractines have three rows of spines along the distal portion of the apical ray.

The large, regular triactines are equiangular, equiactinal, flat, not, or only slightly, raised (as a tripod), with sharp-pointed rays c. 115 μm long and c. 11.8 μm in diameter at the base. The large parasagittal triactines are like the regular triactines but with one ray up to 20% longer than the other two rays. The large, regular tetractines are similar to the large triactines with the addition of a shorter, smooth apical ray c. 110 μm long and c. 11.5 μm in diameter at the base. The small, regular triactines are equiangular, equiactinal sharp-pointed rays c. 56 μm long and 5.6 μm in diameter at the base. The small, regular tetractines are generally similar to the small triactines with an addition of an apical ray. This ray can be accurately measured in only a few cases where it is only slightly (10%) shorter than the basal rays. The basal rays are c. 58 μm long and c. 5 μm in diameter at the base. About 65% of the small tetractines have three rows of spines along the proximal portion of the distal half of the apical ray. The number of spines in each row ranges from two to five but is typically three or four. Their length often exceeds the diameter of the adjacent portion of the apical ray. The three spine rows are oriented at the same angles as the basal rays. The spines and ray apex appear to have a granular rather than a smooth surface. The small, sagittal tetractines are approximately the same size as the small regular tetractines with paired rays curved towards the unpaired ray. They constitute a small percentage of the tetractines.
