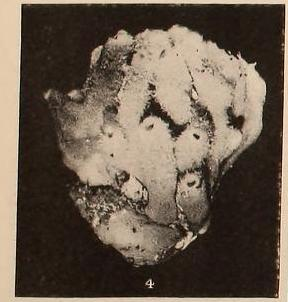
- Plate 25 Fig 4 from Dendy & Frederick, 1924
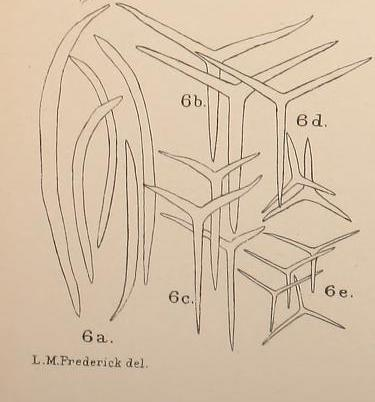
- Plate 26 Fig 6 from Dendy & Frederick, 1924

Scientific classification
- Kingdom: Animalia
- Phylum: Porifera
- Class: Calcarea
- Order: Leucosolenida
- Family: Heteropiidae
- Genus: Vosmaeropsis
- Species: V. mackinnoni

Binomial name
- Vosmaeropsis mackinnoni Dendy & Frederick, 1924

= Vosmaeropsis mackinnoni =

Species of sponge

Holotype site (Houtman Abrolhos Islands'"`UNIQ--ref-0000000A-QINU`"'

Vosmaeropsis mackinnoni is a species of calcareous sponge belonging to the family Heteropiidae, and was first described in 1924 by Arthur Dendy and Leslie M. Frederick. It is known only from its type locality in the Abrolhos Islands, in Western Australia.

== Description ==
Dendy and Fredericks description is:

"Sponge (PI. 25. fig. 4) colonial, consisting of a number of short, thick, subcylindrical individuals united together in an irregular manner along a greater or lesser portion of their length. Each individual has a circular or oval osculum at its summit; in perfect individuals a beautiful oscular fringe is present, formed of very long, hair-like oxea; in others this fringe is broken off short. The individuals vary rather in size owing to their peculiar branching and colonial habit; an average full-grown person is 15 mm. in height and 3 mm. in diameter, the thickness of the wall being 1.3 mm. The outer surface is rough and uneven, and large oxea can be seen projecting irregularly from it; these oxea are more or less absent from the basal portions of the sponge, where the surface is much more even and only slightly roughened. Colour in spirit pale brown; texture rather fragile.

Both dermal and gastral cortices are well developed the former about 0.18 and the latter about 0.1 mm. thick. Between these lies the chamber layer with a thickness of about 1 mm.

The canal system is "sylleibid," the elongated flagellate chambers, up to 0.4 mm. in length, opening into wide exhalant canals, which interdigitate with the main inhalant canals running in from beneath the dermal cortex. Small, scattered dermal pores lead into much narrower inhalant canals, which pierce the dermal cortex to open into the wide outer ends of these main inhalant canals. The collared cells are apicinucleate. The skeleton of the dermal cortex consists of tangentially placed triradiates of various sizes, beneath which lie the short rays of the subdermal pseudosagittal triradiates. The skeleton of the gastral cortex consists exclusively of rather slender triradiates arranged tangentially, which become strongly sagittal (alate) towards the osculum, with the oral arms extended parallel with the margin of the latter. The skeleton of the chamber layer consists of (1) the contripetally directed rays of the large subdermal pseudosagittal triradiates, (2) very large and stout subgastral sagittal triradiates, (3) similar triradiates whose paired rays lie at a variable distance beneath the gastral cortex, (4) the inner portions of the large oxea, whose outer portions project through the dermal cortex.

Spicules: — (1) Triradiates of the dermal cortex (PI. 26. Fig.. 6 d); approximately regular, with conical, gradually tapering, sharply-pointed rays, measuring from about 0.23 by 0.026 to 0.4 by 0.04 mm.

(2) Triradiates of the gastral cortex (PI. 26. fig. 6 e); approximately regular and more or less strongly sagittal; much smaller on the average than those of the dermal cortex, with slender, gradually tapering, sharply-pointedrays measuring about 0.21 by 0.013 mm.

(3) Subdermal pseudosagittal triradiates (PI. 26. fig. 6 c); the three rays are all different; the true basal ray, now forming a false pair with one of the orals, is the shortest of the three and straight or nearly so, conical and gradually sharp-pointed, measuring, say, 0.21 by 0.026 mm; the oral ray which forms an apparent pair with the basal is rather longer, measuring, say, 0.26 by 0.026 mm., and more or less crooked; the other oral ray, now centripetally directed, is much longer and more slender, measuring, say, 0.5 by 0.02 mm., perfectly straight and gradually sharp-pointed.

(4) Subgastral sagittal triradiates (PI. 26. fig. 6 b); very large and stout, rays conical, gradually and sharply pointed, oral rays often slightly curved or crooked, basal ray (centrifugally directed) longer than orals; oral rays measuring, say, 0.41 by 0.04 mm., with basal 0.52 by 0.'05 mm., but variable.

(5) More distal triradiates of the chamber layer (PL 26. fig. 6 b); not sharply distinguishable from (4), but usually with shorter basal rays and straighter orals.

(6) Large oxea (PL 26, fig. 6 a), echinating the outer surface of: the sponge; stout, curved, often crooked, especially the outer part, the inner portion being straighter and tapering more gradually; fairly sharply pointed at each end; measuring up to 1.2 by 0.06 mm.

(7) Oxea of the peristomial fringe; very long and slender, hair-like, usually broken off; measuring up to 2.3 by 0.009 mm.; outer ends hastate, very sharply pointed."
