= Eilhardia =

Scientific classification
- Kingdom: Animalia
- Phylum: Porifera
- Class: Calcarea
- Order: Baerida
- Family: Baeriidae
- Genus: Eilhardia; Poléjaeff, 1883
- Species: E. schulzei

Binomial name
- Eilhardia schulzei Poléjaeff, 1883

Genus of sponges

Eilhardia is a genus of calcareous sponges in the family Baeriidae. It contains one species, Eilhardia schulzei.
