= Levinella =

Scientific classification
- Kingdom: Animalia
- Phylum: Porifera
- Class: Calcarea
- Order: Clathrinida
- Family: Levinellidae
- Genus: Levinella; Borojevic & Boury-Esnault, 1986

Genus of sponges

Levinella is a genus of sponges belonging to the family Levinellidae.

The species of this genus are found in Europe, Africa and Australia.

Species:

- Levinella prolifera (Dendy, 1913)
- Levinella thalassae Borojevic & Boury-Esnault, 1986
