= Leucyssa =

Scientific classification
- Kingdom: Animalia
- Phylum: Porifera
- Class: Calcarea
- Order: Baerida
- Family: Trichogypsiidae
- Genus: Leucyssa; Haeckel, 1872
- Species: L. spongilla

Binomial name
- Leucyssa spongilla Haeckel, 1872

Genus of sponges

Leucyssa is a genus of calcareous sponges in the family Trichogypsiidae. It consists of one species, Leucyssa spongilla.
