= Vosmaeropsis recruta =

Scientific classification
- Kingdom: Animalia
- Phylum: Porifera
- Class: Calcarea
- Order: Leucosolenida
- Family: Heteropiidae
- Genus: Vosmaeropsis
- Species: V. recruta

Binomial name
- Vosmaeropsis recruta Cavalcanti, Bastos & Lanna, 2015

Species of sponge

Vosmaeropsis recruta is a species of calcareous sponge in the family Heteropiidae, and was first described in 2015 by Cavalcanti, Bastos & Lanna. It is found off the Brazilian coast.
