= Burtonulla =

Scientific classification
- Kingdom: Animalia
- Phylum: Porifera
- Class: Calcarea
- Order: Clathrinida
- Family: Levinellidae
- Genus: Burtonulla; Borojevic & Boury-Esnault, 1986

Genus of sponges

Burtonulla is a genus of sponges belonging to the family Levinellidae.

The species of this genus are found in Indonesia.

Species:

- Burtonulla sibogae Borojevic & Boury-Esnault, 1986
