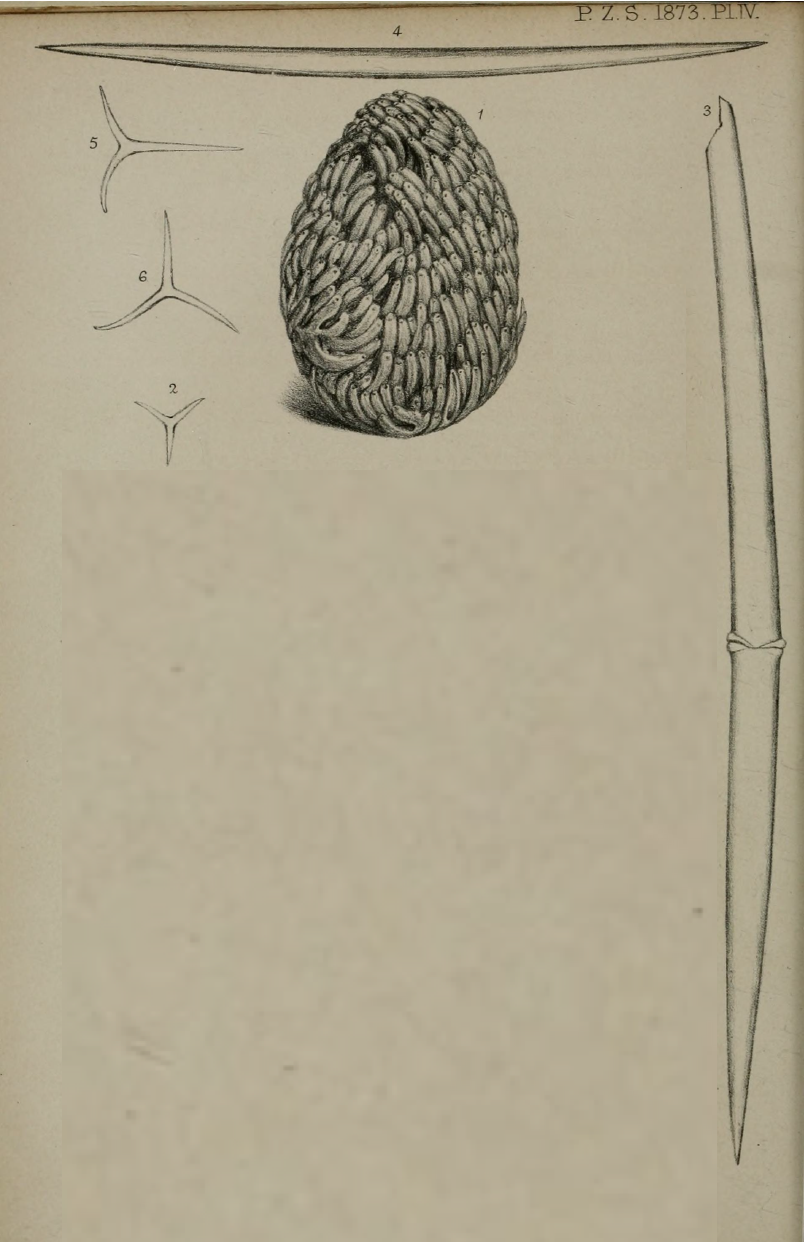
- Plate 4 from Bowerbank

Scientific classification
- Kingdom: Animalia
- Phylum: Porifera
- Class: Calcarea
- Order: Leucosolenida
- Family: Heteropiidae
- Genus: Heteropia
- Species: H. glomerosa

Binomial name
- Heteropia glomerosa (Bowerbank, 1873)

= Heteropia glomerosa =

Species of calcareous sponge

Heteropia glomerosa is a species of calcareous sponge in the family Heteropiidae, and was first described as Leuconia glomerosa in 1873 by James Scott Bowerbank. In Australia, the species is found in the IMCRA regions of the Central Western Shelf Transition, Central Western Shelf Province, Northwest Province, and the Central Western Transition (on the north-west Western Australian coastline).

The dried type specimen came from Port Elizabeth and brought by Captain Charles Tyler to Bowerbank.

== Description ==
Plate 4 from Bowerbank's description of Leuconia glomerosa

1. Fig.1. The type specimenm, natural size.
2. Fig.2. One of the equiangular triradiate spicula of the dermal membrane, magnified 80 linear.
3. Fig. 3. One of the largest-sized fusiformi-acerate dermal spicula, which has been fractured near its middle and cemented together again: magnified 80 linear.
4. Fig. 4. A small-sized fusiformi-acerate dermal spiculum, magnified 80 linear.
5. Fig. 5 & 6. Two of the triradiate spicula of the interstitial skeleton, magnified 80 linear.
