= Baeria =

Baeria is an unaccepted scientific name and may refer to two different genera:

- Lasthenia, genus of flowers
- Leuconia, a genus of sea sponges

== See also ==
- Baiera
