= Lamontia =

Scientific classification
- Kingdom: Animalia
- Phylum: Porifera
- Class: Calcarea
- Order: Baerida
- Family: Baeriidae
- Genus: Lamontia; Kirk, 1895
- Species: L. zona

Binomial name
- Lamontia zona Kirk, 1895

Genus of sponges

Lamontia is a genus of calcareous sponges in the family Baeriidae. It consists of one species, Lamontia zona Kirk, 1895. The genus and species were described by New Zealand biologist Harry Borrer Kirk in 1895. The type locality of Lamontia zona is Cook Strait, New Zealand.
