= Levinellidae =

Scientific classification
- Kingdom: Animalia
- Phylum: Porifera
- Class: Calcarea
- Order: Clathrinida
- Family: Levinellidae; Borojevic & Boury-Esnault, 1986

Genera
- See text

Family of sponges

Levinellidae is a family of calcareous sponges in the order Clathrinida. It contains the following genera and species:

- Genus Burtonulla Borojevic & Boury-Esnault, 1986
  - Burtonulla sibogae Borojevic & Boury-Esnault, 1986
- Genus Levinella Borojevic & Boury-Esnault, 1986
  - Levinella prolifera (Dendy, 1913)
  - Levinella thalassae Borojevic & Boury-Esnault, 1986
- Genus Sycettaga Haeckel, 1872
  - Sycettaga primitiva Haeckel, 1872
