= Boonkrong Indhusophon =

Thai philatelist

- Occupation: philatelist

Boonkrong "Ad" Indhusophon FRPSL is a Thai philatelist (postal stamp and postage history expert) who signed the Roll of Distinguished Philatelists in 2001.

She was married to philatelist Prakaipet Indhusophon, and continued his work after his death in April 1991. In addition to developing her husband's collections, she has created her own specialised collections of Cape Triangulars which won a Grand Prix medal at CAPEX 96 and at IPEX 98, and Cape Revenues which won a gold medal at IPEX 98.
