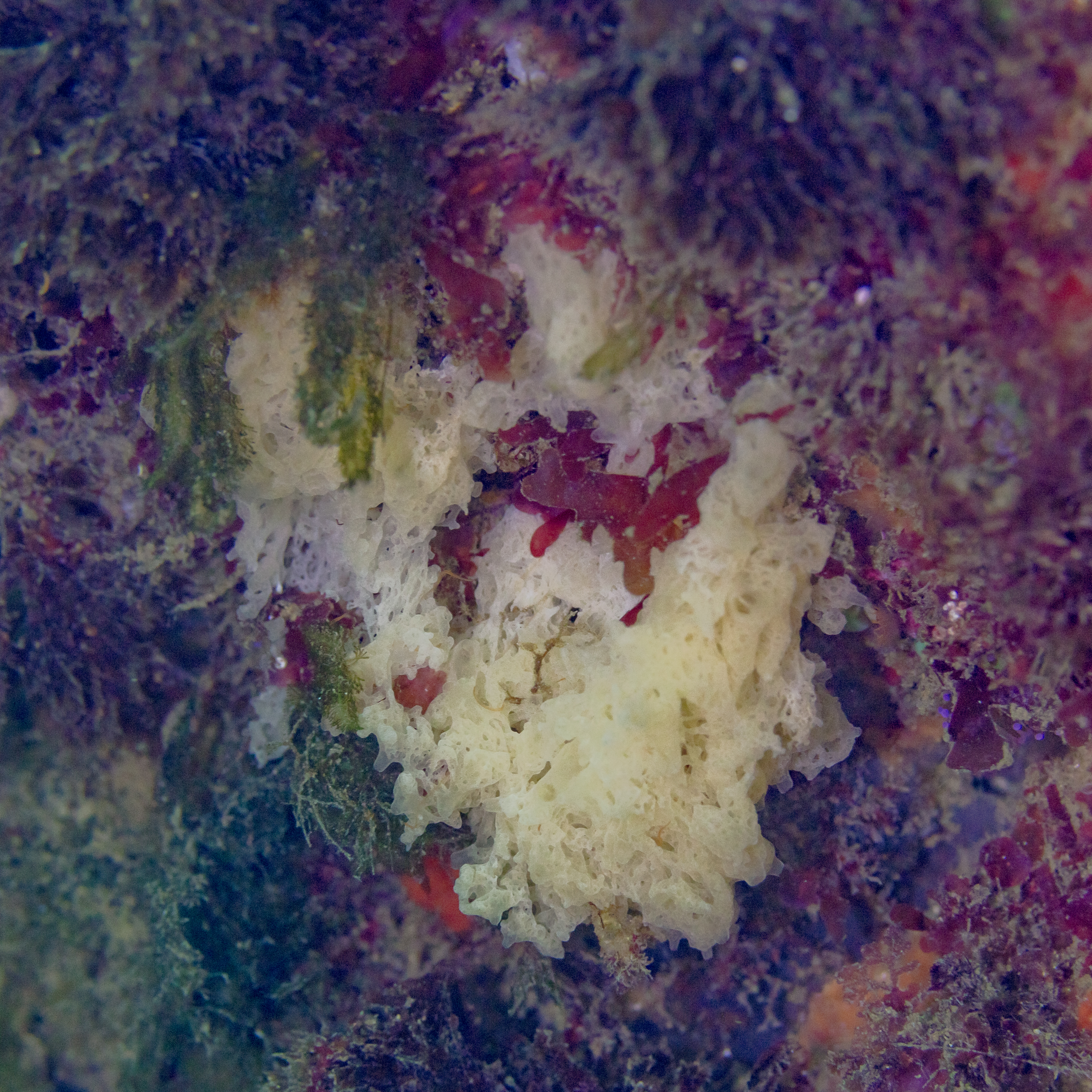
- Borojevia cerebrum

Scientific classification
- Kingdom: Animalia
- Phylum: Porifera
- Class: Calcarea
- Order: Clathrinida
- Family: Clathrinidae
- Genus: Borojevia; Klautau, Azevedo, Cóndor-Luján, Rapp, Collins & Russo, 2013

= Borojevia =

Genus of sponges

Borojevia is a genus of calcareous sponge in the family Clathrinidae. The genus is named after sponge researcher Radovan Borojevic.

== Description ==
Calcinea in which the cormus comprises tightly anastomosed tubes. The skeleton contains regular (equiangular and equiradiate) triactines, tetractines and tripods. The apical actine of the tetractines has spines. Aquiferous system asconoid.

== Species ==
- Borojevia aspina (Klautau, Solé-Cava & Borojevic, 1994)
- Borojevia brasiliensis (Solé-Cava, Klautau, Boury-Esnault, Borojevic & Thorpe, 1991)
- Borojevia cerebrum (Haeckel, 1872)
- Borojevia croatica Klautau, Imesek, Azevedo, Plese, Nikolic & Cetkovic, 2016
- Borojevia crystallina Fontana, Cóndor-Luján, Azevedo, Pérez & Klautau, 2018
- Borojevia paracerebrum (Austin, 1996)
- Borojevia pirella Van Soest & De Voogd, 2018
- Borojevia tetrapodifera (Klautau & Valentine, 2003)
- Borojevia tenuispinata Azevedo, Padua, Moraes, Rossi, Muricy & Klautau, 2017
- Borojevia trispinata Azevedo, Padua, Moraes, Rossi, Muricy & Klautau, 2017
- Borojevia tubulata Van Soest & De Voogd, 2018
- Borojevia voigti Van Soest & De Voogd, 2018
