= Sycettaga =

Scientific classification
- Kingdom: Animalia
- Phylum: Porifera
- Class: Calcarea
- Order: Clathrinida
- Family: Levinellidae
- Genus: Sycettaga; Haeckel, 1872

Genus of sponges

Sycettaga is a genus of sponges belonging to the family Levinellidae.

The species of this genus are found in Australia.

Species:

- Sycettaga primitiva (Haeckel, 1872)
