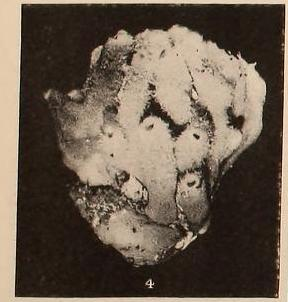

Scientific classification
- Domain: Eukaryota
- Kingdom: Animalia
- Phylum: Porifera
- Class: Calcarea
- Order: Leucosolenida
- Family: Heteropiidae
- Genus: Vosmaeropsis; Dendy, 1893

= Vosmaeropsis =

Genus of sponges

Vosmaeropsis is a genus of sponges in the family, Heteropiidae, and was first described in 1893 by Arthur Dendy. The type species by subsequent designation is Vosmaeropsis macera (Carter, 1886).

== Distribution ==
GBIF with just 25 georeferenced specimens in this genus, shows it with an apparent world-wide distribution. The Australian Faunal Directory shows as being found on/off the coast of Victoria, and the coasts of north-west and south-west Western Australia.

== Accepted species ==
(according to WoRMS)

- Vosmaeropsis complanatispinifera Cavalcanti, Bastos & Lanna, 2015
- Vosmaeropsis connexiva (Poléjaeff, 1883)
- Vosmaeropsis cyathus (Verrill, 1873)
- Vosmaeropsis depressa Dendy, 1893
- Vosmaeropsis gardineri Ferrer-Hernandez, 1916
- Vosmaeropsis glebula Van Soest & De Voogd, 2018
- Vosmaeropsis grisea Tanita, 1939
- Vosmaeropsis hispanica Ferrer Hernández, 1933
- Vosmaeropsis hozawai Borojevic & Klautau, 2000
- Vosmaeropsis inflata Tanita, 1942
- Vosmaeropsis japonica Hôzawa, 1929
- Vosmaeropsis levis Hôzawa, 1940
- Vosmaeropsis macera (Carter, 1886)
- Vosmaeropsis mackinnoni Dendy & Frederick, 1924
- Vosmaeropsis maculata Hôzawa, 1929
- Vosmaeropsis oruetai Ferrer-Hernández, 1918
- Vosmaeropsis ovata Tanita, 1942
- Vosmaeropsis recruta Cavalcanti, Bastos & Lanna, 2015
- Vosmaeropsis sasakii Hôzawa, 1929
- Vosmaeropsis sericata (Ridley, 1881)
- Vosmaeropsis simplex Hôzawa, 1940
- Vosmaeropsis spinosa Tanita, 1943
- Vosmaeropsis triradiata Hôzawa, 1940
- Vosmaeropsis wilsoni Dendy, 1893
