= Lepidoleucon =

Scientific classification
- Kingdom: Animalia
- Phylum: Porifera
- Class: Calcarea
- Order: Baerida
- Family: Lepidoleuconidae; Vacelet, 1967
- Genus: Lepidoleucon; Vacelet, 1967
- Species: L. inflatum

Binomial name
- Lepidoleucon inflatum Vacelet, 1967

Genus of sponges

Lepidoleucon is genus of calcareous sponges in the order Baerida. It is the only genus in the monotypic family Lepidoleuconidae, and consists of a single species, Lepidoleucon inflatum.
