= Heteropia =

Scientific classification
- Domain: Eukaryota
- Kingdom: Animalia
- Phylum: Porifera
- Class: Calcarea
- Order: Leucosolenida
- Family: Heteropiidae
- Genus: Heteropia; Carter, 1886

Genus of sponges

Heteropia is a genus of sponges in the family Heteropiidae, and was first described in 1886 by Henry John Carter. The type species by monotypy is Heteropia ramosa (Carter, 1886), which he first called Aphroceras ramosa in the very same publication.

== Distribution ==
GBIF with just 37 georeferenced specimens in this genus, shows it having perhaps a world-wide distribution. The Australian Faunal Directory shows as being found on/off the coast of Western Australia, in the IMCRA regions of Central Western Shelf Transition, Central Western Shelf Province, Northwest Province, and the Central Western Transition.

== Accepted species ==
(according to WoRMS)

- Heteropia glomerosa (Bowerbank, 1873)
- Heteropia medioarticulata Hôzawa, 1918
- Heteropia minor Burton, 1930
- Heteropia ramosa (Carter, 1886)
- Heteropia rodgeri Lambe, 1900
- Heteropia striata Hôzawa, 1916
