= Paraheteropia =

Scientific classification
- Kingdom: Animalia
- Phylum: Porifera
- Class: Calcarea
- Order: Leucosolenida
- Family: Heteropiidae
- Genus: Paraheteropia; Borojevic, 1965
- Species: P. ijimai

Binomial name
- Paraheteropia ijimai (Hôzawa, 1916)

Genus of sponges

Paraheteropia is a genus of sponges in the family Heteropiidae.The only species is Paraheteropia ijimai (Hôzawa, 1916).
