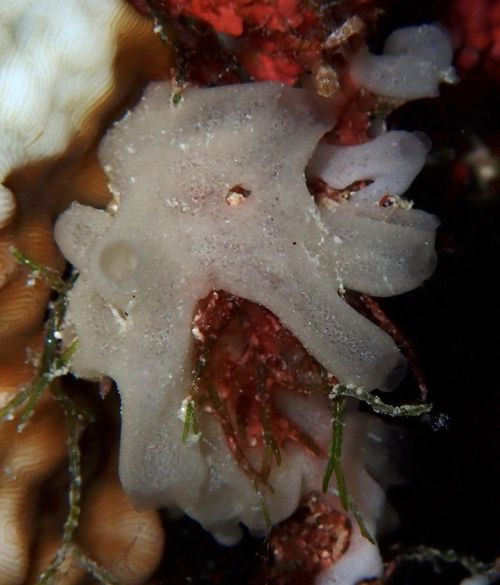

Scientific classification
- Kingdom: Animalia
- Phylum: Porifera
- Class: Calcarea
- Order: Clathrinida
- Family: Clathrinidae
- Genus: Borojevia
- Species: B. tubulata

Binomial name
- Borojevia tubulata Van Soest & De Voogd, 2018

= Borojevia tubulata =

Species of sponge

Borojevia tubulata is a species of calcareous sponge from the Western Indian Ocean and Red Sea.
