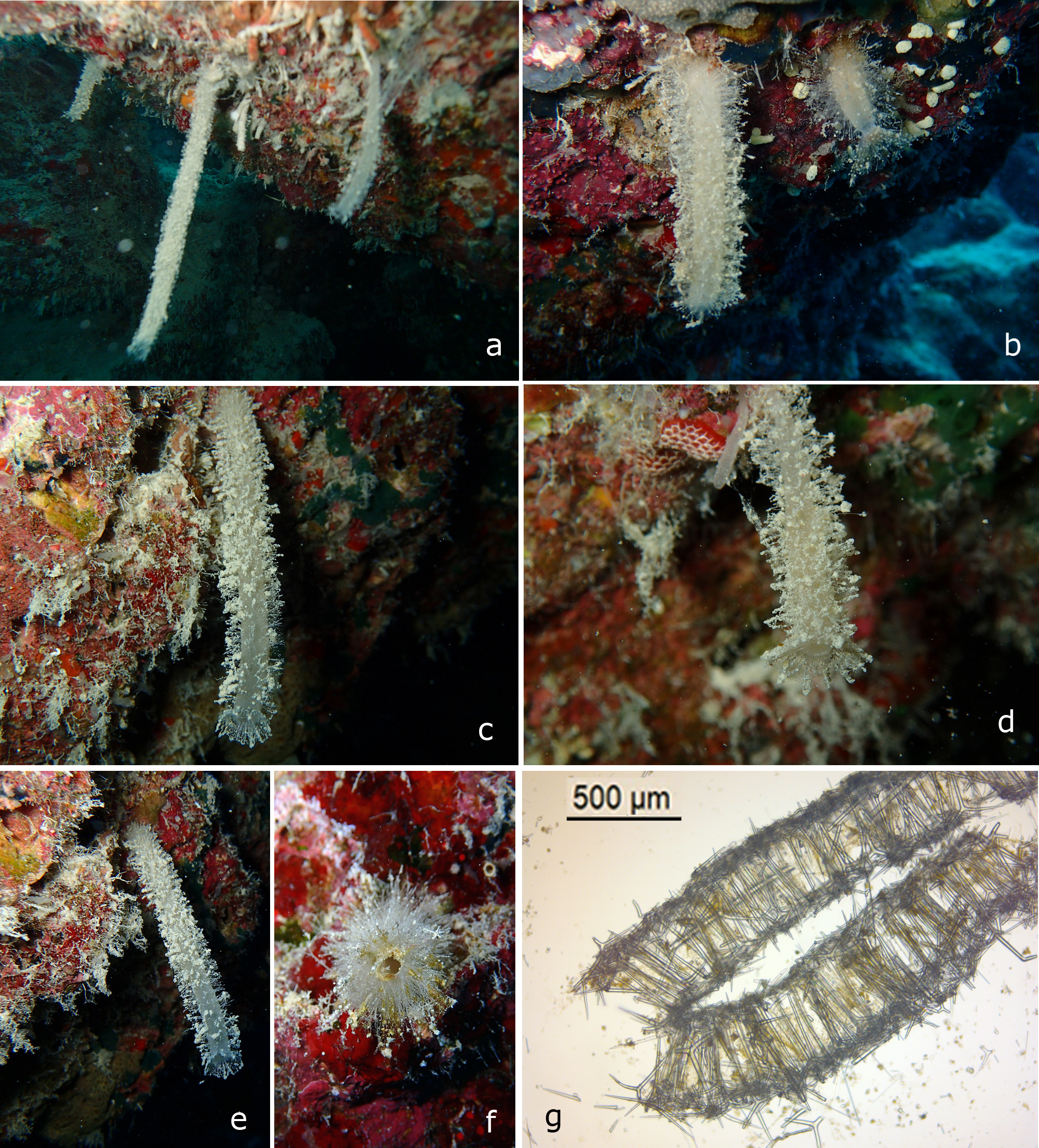

Scientific classification
- Domain: Eukaryota
- Kingdom: Animalia
- Phylum: Porifera
- Class: Calcarea
- Order: Leucosolenida
- Family: Heteropiidae
- Genus: Sycettusa; Haeckel, 1872

= Sycettusa =

Genus of sponges

Sycettusa is a genus of sponges in the family Heteropiidae.

The following species are recognized in this genus:

- Sycettusa chilensis Azevedo, Hajdu, Willenz & Klautau, 2009
- Sycettusa flamma (Poléjaeff, 1883)
- Sycettusa glabra (Row, 1909)
- Sycettusa glacialis (Haeckel, 1872)
- Sycettusa hastifera (Row, 1909)
- Sycettusa hirsutissima Van Soest & De Voogd, 2018
- Sycettusa kuekenthali (Breitfuss, 1896)
- Sycettusa lanceolata (Breitfuss, 1898)
- Sycettusa murmanensis (Breitfuss, 1898)
- Sycettusa nitida (Arnesen, 1900)
- Sycettusa pelagica (Ridley, 1881)
- Sycettusa poculum (Poléajeff, 1883)
- Sycettusa sibogae (Burton, 1930)
- Sycettusa simplex (Jenkin, 1908)
- Sycettusa stauridia (Haeckel, 1872)
- Sycettusa sycilloides (Schuffner, 1877)
- Sycettusa tenuis Borojevic & Klautau, 2000
- Sycettusa thompsoni (Lambe, 1900)
- Sycettusa zanzibaris (Jenkin, 1908)
