= Postage stamps and postal history of Bangkok =

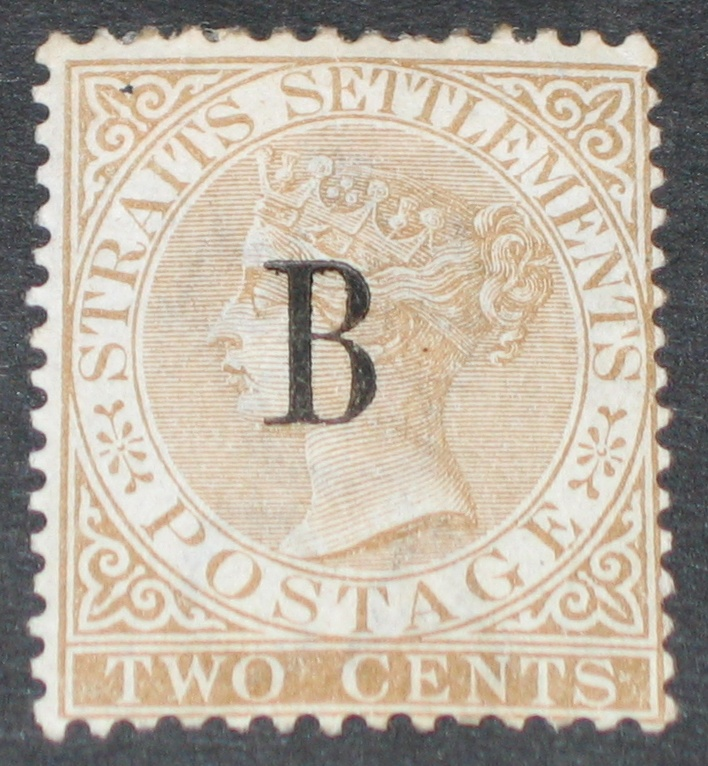
Postage stamp issued for Bangkok

This is a survey of the postage stamps and postal history of the British post office in Bangkok, Thailand.

The earliest recorded mail from Bangkok dates back only to 1836 when American missionary Dan Beach Bradley sent a letter to his father in a stampless cover. The British Consular Post Office in Bangkok was established by Great Britain in 1858 as a consequence of a treaty signed between Great Britain and Siam (now known as Thailand) on 18 April 1855, and in response to a demand by expatriate merchants and missionaries. It ceased to provide service on 1 July 1885, the day Siam joined the Universal Postal Union and started its own international postal service. During that time most of the mail from Bangkok was sent by diplomatic pouch to Singapore for forwarding. Thus most such mail has a Singapore cancel.

Initially, postage stamps of India were used here and throughout the Straits Settlements. This lasted until 1867 when Straits Settlements stamps were first produced. When Honorary Postmaster Gardner complained in 1881 that he should be compensated for the increasing amount of work that was required of him it was agreed that a portion of the revenue for stamp sales would be retained. This led to the overprinting during 1882 of Straits Settlement with the letter B, representing Bangkok, for use there. The Bangkok 30mm diameter circular date stamp postmark was also introduced during this period. Most outbound mail was still sent to enter the postal system at Singapore (for European destinations). Some Hong Kong stamps continued to be used throughout this time for mail forwarded through Hong Kong to Chinese, Japanese, and United States destinations. A few British stamps are also known to have been used in Bangkok. Inbound mail from steamboats was kept at the post office for people to come to pick up.

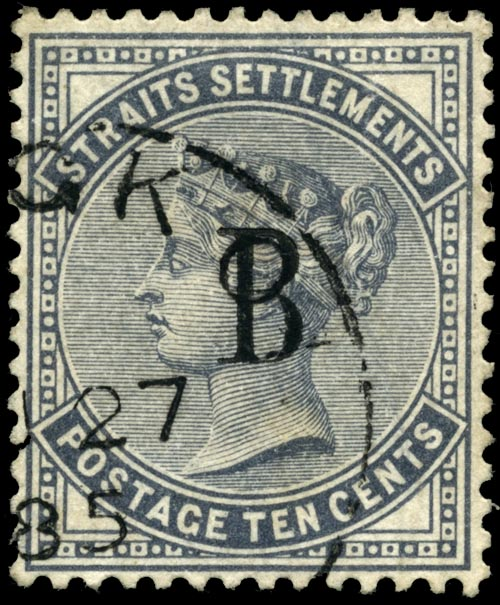
A used 10-cent value, most likely postmarked 27 June 1885, a few days before post office closure

After the closure of the post office in July 1885, the B overprinted stamps were seen used elsewhere. An example is a cover sent from Singapore in December 1887 bearing postage stamps from Straits Settlements both with and without the overprint.

Forgeries of the overprinted "B" stamps are very common.

== See also ==
- Postage stamps and postal history of Thailand
