= Petrostroma =

Scientific classification
- Domain: Eukaryota
- Kingdom: Animalia
- Phylum: Porifera
- Class: Calcarea
- Order: Lithonida
- Family: Minchinellidae
- Genus: Petrostroma; Döderlein, 1892

Genus of sponges

Petrostroma is a genus of calcareous sponges belonging to the family Minchinellidae.

Fossil species of this genus are found in Europe, but the extant type species, P. schulzei, is found in Sagami Bay, Japan.

Species:

- Petrostroma schulzei Döderlein, 1892
