= Plectroninia =

Scientific classification
- Domain: Eukaryota
- Kingdom: Animalia
- Phylum: Porifera
- Class: Calcarea
- Order: Lithonida
- Family: Minchinellidae
- Genus: Plectroninia; Hinde, 1900

Genus of sponges

Plectroninia is a genus of sponges belonging to the family Minchinellidae.

The species of this genus are found in Europe and Australia.

Species:

- Plectroninia celtica Könnecker & Freiwald, 2005
- Plectroninia deansi Kirkpatrick, 1911
- Plectroninia halli Hinde, 1900
