= Borojevia tetrapodifera =

Scientific classification
- Kingdom: Animalia
- Phylum: Porifera
- Class: Calcarea
- Order: Clathrinida
- Family: Clathrinidae
- Genus: Borojevia
- Species: B. tetrapodifera

Binomial name
- Borojevia tetrapodifera (Klautau & Valentine, 2003)

Synonyms
- Clathrina tetrapodifera Klautau & Valentine, 2003

Species of sponge

Borojevia tetrapodifera is a species of calcareous sponge from New Zealand. The species is named after the presence of tetrapods, the only Clathrinid sponge known to possess such spicules.

== Description ==
The cormus is formed of thin, regular and tightly anastomosed tubes. It is attached to the substrate by a few tubes, which are not true stalks. There are no water-collecting tubes, but vents on the surface. Cells with granules could not be found because of the state of preservation of the type specimen. The skeleton comprises equiangular and equiradiate triactines and tetractines on the tubes’ interior, and tripods and tetrapods on the exterior delimiting the cormus. The actines of the triactines and tetractines are conical, with sharp tips. The apical actine of the tetractines is shorter than the facial ones, conical, sharp and straight. The spines are located at the tip. Tripods and tetrapods are very abundant. The tripods are true tripods. Tetrapods are similar to tripods in that they also possess stout actines and a raised centre. However, they have developed a fourth, apical, actine, which is shorter than the facial ones; it is conical and differs from the apical actine of the tetractines in that it is smooth.
