= Grantessa =

Scientific classification
- Kingdom: Animalia
- Phylum: Porifera
- Class: Calcarea
- Order: Leucosolenida
- Family: Heteropiidae
- Genus: Grantessa; Lendenfeld, 1885

Genus of sponges

Grantessa is a genus of sponges in the family Heteropiidae, and was first described in 1885 by Lendenfeld.

The following species are recognized in this genus:

- Grantessa ampullae Hôzawa, 1940
- Grantessa anisactina Borojevic & Peixinho, 1976
- Grantessa basipapillata Hôzawa, 1916
- Grantessa bifida Tanita, 1943
- Grantessa boomerang (Dendy, 1893)
- Grantessa borojevici Van Soest & De Voogd, 2015
- Grantessa compressa (Carter, 1886)
- Grantessa erecta (Carter, 1886)
- Grantessa erinaceus (Carter, 1886)
- Grantessa gracilis (Lendenfeld, 1885)
- Grantessa grantiformis Koltun, 1952
- Grantessa hirsuta (Carter, 1886)
- Grantessa hispida Dendy, 1893
- Grantessa intusarticulata (Carter, 1886)
- Grantessa mitsukurii Hôzawa, 1916
- Grantessa nemurensis Hôzawa, 1929
- Grantessa parva Tanita, 1942
- Grantessa pluriosculifera (Carter, 1886)
- Grantessa polyperistomia (Carter, 1886)
- Grantessa preiwischi Dendy & Row, 1913
- Grantessa ramosa (Smith in Haeckel, 1872)
- Grantessa rarispinosa Borojevic, 1967
- Grantessa sacca Lendenfeld, 1885
- Grantessa sagamiana Hôzawa, 1916
- Grantessa shimeji Hôzawa, 1916
- Grantessa shimoda Tanita, 1942
- Grantessa spissa (Carter, 1886)
- Grantessa tenhoveni Van Soest & De Voogd, 2015
- Grantessa tumida Cóndor-Luján, Louzada, Hajdu & Klautau, 2018
- Grantessa woerheidei Van Soest & De Voogd, 2018
