= Borojevia brasiliensis =

Scientific classification
- Kingdom: Animalia
- Phylum: Porifera
- Class: Calcarea
- Order: Clathrinida
- Family: Clathrinidae
- Genus: Borojevia
- Species: B. brasiliensis

Binomial name
- Borojevia brasiliensis (Solé-Cava, Klautau, Boury-Esnault, Borojevic and Thorpe, 1991)

Synonyms
- Clathrina brasiliensis Solé-Cava, Klautau, Boury-Esnault, Borojevic and Thorpe, 1991

Species of sponge

Borojevia brasiliensis is a species of calcareous sponge from Brazil, from which the species' name is derived.

== Description ==
Cormus massive, formed of thin, regular and tightly anastomosed tubes. Oscula are simple openings, surrounded by a thin membrane, and located on the top of short conical projections. They receive water from large water-collecting tubes.

The skeleton comprises three kinds of spicule: triactines, tetractines and tripods. The triactines and tetractines are equiradiate and equiangular, with conical actines and blunt tips. The apical actine of the tetractines is shorter and thinner than the facial ones, and it is conical, sharp and covered with short spines. This actine is always projected towards the inside of the tubes. Tripods are more irregular than the triactines and tetractines, and frequently they are sagittal. They normally have their centre raised but sometimes look like large conical triactines. However, it is possible to distinguish them from large triactines because of the strong conical shape of their actines and because of their location. They are distributed on the surface of the external tubes in a monolayer, delimiting the cormus. Habitat is sciaphile.
