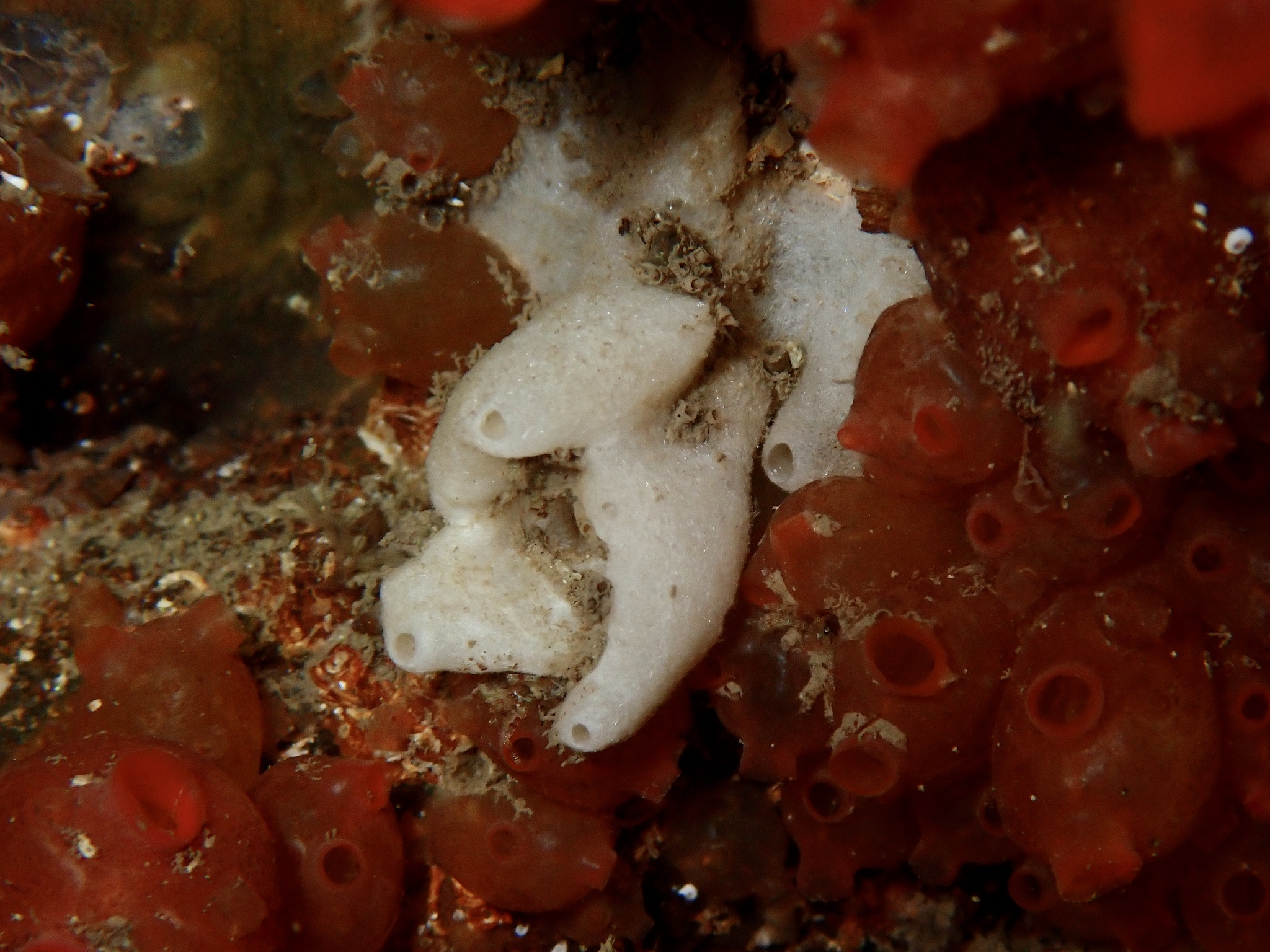

Scientific classification
- Kingdom: Animalia
- Phylum: Porifera
- Class: Calcarea
- Order: Baerida
- Family: Baeriidae
- Genus: Leuconia; Grant, 1833

Species
- See text

Synonyms
- Baeria Miklucho-Maclay, 1870

= Leuconia =

Genus of sponges

Leuconia is a genus of calcareous sponges in the family Baeriidae. It was described by English anatomist and zoologist Robert Edmond Grant in 1833.

== Species ==
The following species of Leuconia are accepted in the World Porifera database:

- Leuconia alaskensis de Laubenfels, 1953
- Leuconia dura (Hozawa, 1929)
- Leuconia gladiator (Dendy, 1893)
- Leuconia johnstoni Carter, 1871
- Leuconia joubini (Topsent, 1907)
- Leuconia nivea (Grant, 1826)
- Leuconia ochotensis (Miklucho-Maclay, 1870)
- Leuconia usa (de Laubenfels, 1942)

Several other species formerly treated as part of Leuconia have been transferred to other genera, primarily Leucandra.
