= Row Collection =

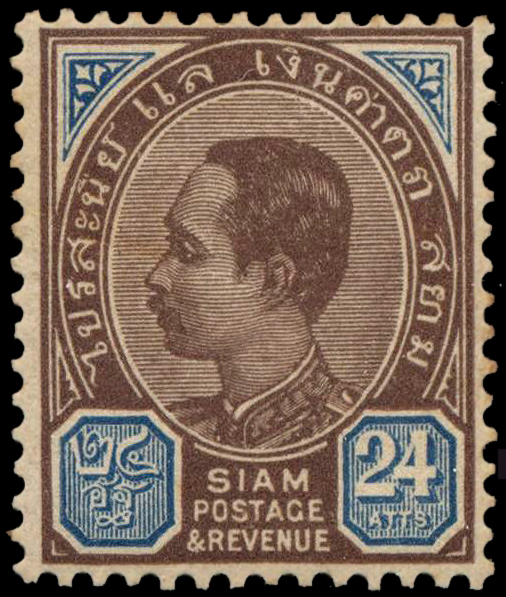
An 1899 stamp of Siam (not from the Row Collection).

The Row Collection is a collection of philatelic material relating to Siam that forms part of the British Library Philatelic Collections. The collection covers the period 1881 to 1918 in 23 volumes. It is mainly of unused material with many blocks, and strong in the various provisional surcharges. It also includes some postal stationery and issues used in Kedah and Kelantan. It was formed by Richard Williams Harold Row and presented to the British Museum in 1919 by Row's mother, Mrs Eliza Row.

== Digitisation ==
The Row Collection was digitised in 2025 and is accessible on the Internet Archive. Metadata for the Row Collection is also indexed by The National Archives via 'Find an Archive' on their Discovery database. The project followed ISAD(G) standards and was licensed under CC BY-NC 4.0.

== See also ==
- Postage stamps and postal history of Thailand
- The Row Collection, 1883–1918 at the Internet Archive
- The Row Collection entry in Find an Archive at The National Archives
