= Richard Williams Harold Row =

British philatelist

- Died: 16 February 1919
- Education: King's College London
- Occupation: Philatelist

Richard Williams Harold Row (died 16 February 1919) was a British philatelist who was one of the "Fathers of Philately" entered on the Roll of Distinguished Philatelists in 1921.

Row was an expert on the stamps of Siam and after his death, his collection was donated to the British Museum by his mother, Mrs Eliza Row. The Row Collection now forms part of the British Library Philatelic Collections. It covers the period 1881 to 1918 in 23 volumes and is mainly of unused material with many blocks, and strong in the various provisional surcharges. It also includes some postal stationery and issues used in Kedah and Kelantan.

A digital version of the Row Collection was published online in 2025 to support public access and research A digital version of the Row Collection was published online in 2025 to support public access and research. Archival catalogue records are structured to ISAD(G) standards and published on the Find an Archive section of The National Archives' Discovery database, where the collection is browsable at fonds, series, sub-series, and file level.

Row was also a zoologist, and worked as Assistant Lecturer and Demonstrator of Zoology at King's College London.

== See also ==
- Postage stamps and postal history of Thailand
- The Row Collection, 1883–1918 at the Internet Archive
- The Row Collection entry in Find an Archive at The National Archives
