= Postage stamps and postal history of Thailand =

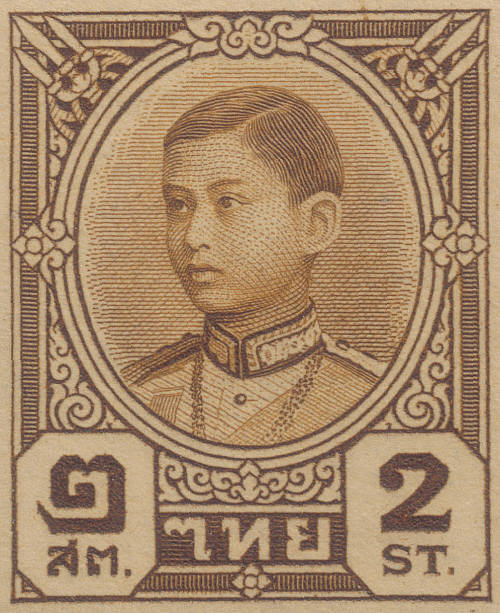
A 1941 stamp of Thailand

This is a survey of the postal history and postage stamps of Thailand.

== Pre-postal era ==
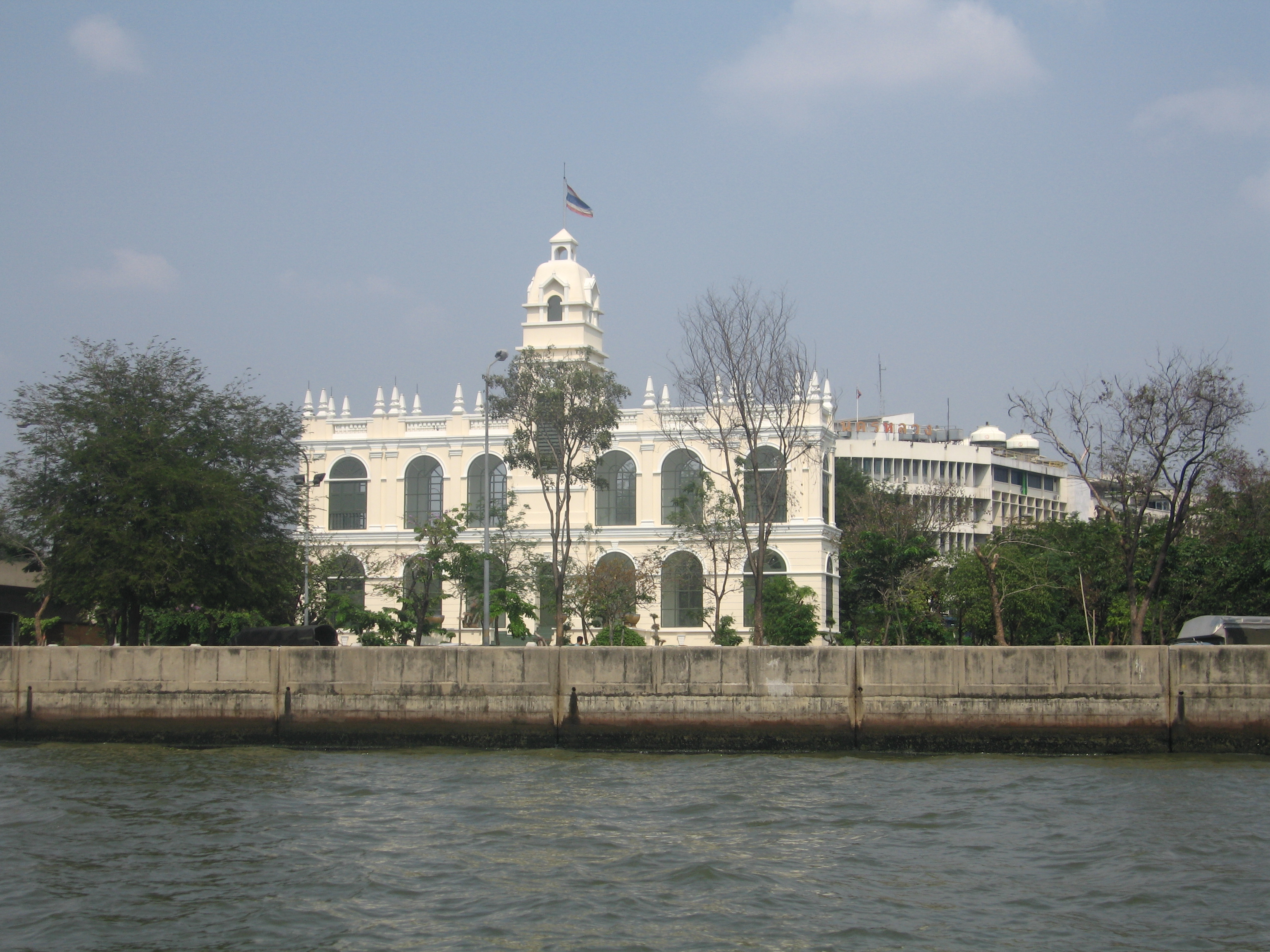
Reconstruction of the Praisaneeyakarn

Before Siam issued its first stamp, there was a limited mail service, mainly for the royal family. Domestic mail travelled by messengers while international mail travelled by steamboat to post offices in nearby countries, such as the Straits Settlements.

The earliest recorded mail from Bangkok dates back only to 1836 when American missionary Dan Beach Bradley sent a letter to his father in a stampless cover. The British Consular Post Office in Bangkok was established by Great Britain in 1858 as a consequence of a treaty signed between Great Britain and Siam (now known as Thailand) on 18 April 1855, and in response to a demand by expatriate merchants and missionaries. Stamps, initially from India and later from Straits Settlements, were used. It ceased to provide service on 1 July 1885, the day Siam joined the Universal Postal Union and started its own international postal service. During that time most of the mail from Bangkok was sent by diplomatic pouch to Singapore for forwarding.

During 1875–1876, there was a daily newspaper named "Court" produced by 11 young princes of Siam. The publication started on 26 September 1875. In its early days, newspaper must be picked up at its office at Ho Niphetwitthaya in the Grand Palace. So Prince Bhanurangsi Savangwongse, ภาณุรังษีสว่างวงศ์, brother of King Chulalongkorn and one of the 11 princes, set up postman in blue dress to deliver the newspaper. Stamps were sold and used for the delivery of the newspapers. The newspaper only published till 15 July 1876 and then stopped.

== Postal system established ==
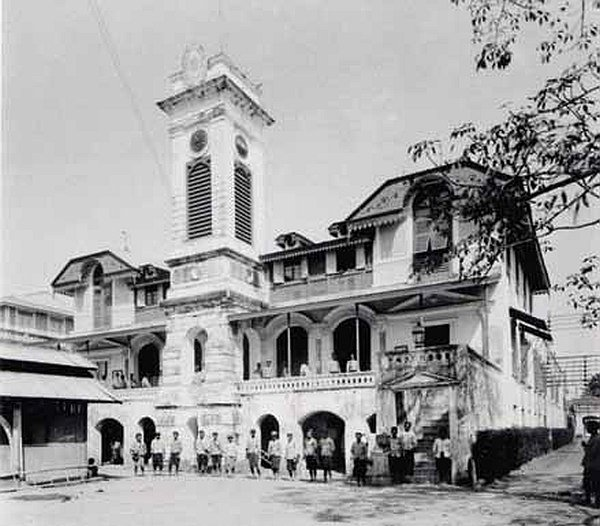
Postal system established in 1883

The first real postal service was established in Siam in 1880. Prince Bhanurangsi Savangwongse was appointed by King Chulalongkorn in 1881 to set up and run the service, due to his earlier experience in running newspaper delivery services. The postal service was started on 4 August 1883 with one post office building, called Praisaneeyakarn (Thai: ไปรษณียาคาร) on the bank of Chao Phraya River near Ong Ang Canal. The first postage stamps—the Solot Series—and a postcard were issued on the same day. The initial postal service area was limited to Sam Sen on the north, Bang Kho Laem on the south, Talad Phlu on the west, and Si Prathum on the east. Additional post offices were opened starting with Samut Prakan and Nakhon Khuen Kan (present day Phra Pradaeng District) in July 1885. By 1886 there were 79 post offices throughout the country. Back then water was the main mode of transport. There were very few streets and most were not named. There were no surnames for Thais and letters were often addressed using nicknames.

The first post office was demolished in 1982 to make way for Phra Pok Klao Bridge. A smaller scale reconstruction of the building was built nearby and is used as the Postal Museum.

== Solot Series ==
Solot Series
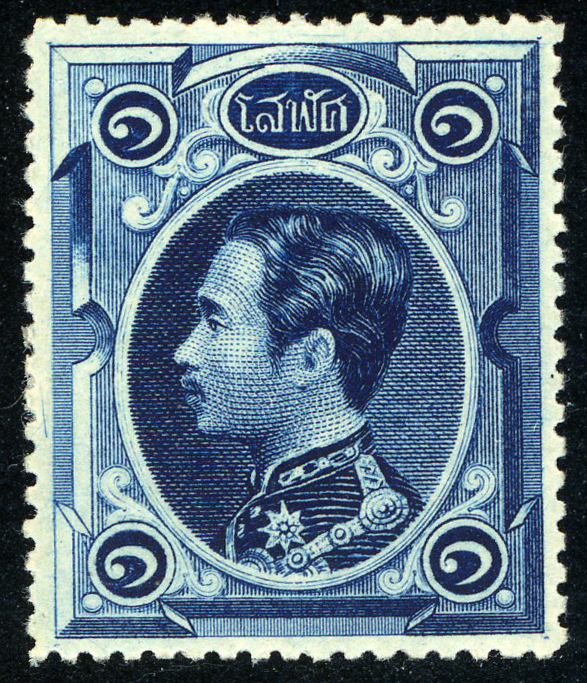
- One-solot stamp
- Date of production: 4 August 1883
- Printer: Waterlow and Sons
- Dimensions: 28 mm × 23 mm (1.10 in × 0.91 in) (solot, att & siao); 25 mm × 22 mm (0.98 in × 0.87 in) (sik); 30 mm × 25 mm (1.18 in × 0.98 in) (fueang & salueng)
- Depicts: King Chulalongkorn
- Notability: First issue of Thailand
- Face value: 1 solot, 1 att, 1 siao, 1 sik, 1 fueang & 1 salueng

The Solot Series (Thai: โสฬส, pronounced [sǒː.lót]) was the first series of definitive stamps issued by Thailand, then known as Siam. It consisted of six face values, each of one solot, att, siao, sik, fueang and salueng, currency units prior to the decimalization of the baht. The series was printed by Waterlow and Sons in London, and was first issued on 4 August 1883, coinciding with the launch of Siam's postal service. Stamps in the series depicted King Chulalongkorn in profile, facing the frame's left, and were neither marked with the country name nor values in an international script. This necessitated the series' replacement in 1887 to comply with the standards of the Universal Postal Union, which Siam had joined in 1885. It is the only series to refer to each of the old currency units; subsequent issues had their values denominated in att. The one-fueang stamp never entered circulation as they were not delivered in time for the postal service's opening. 500,000 stamps were printed for each face value.

=== Gallery ===
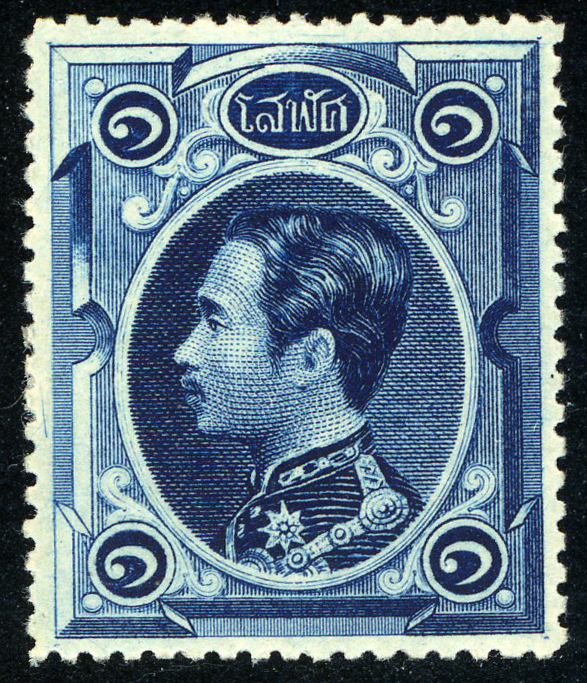
1 solot, one sixteenth of a fueang

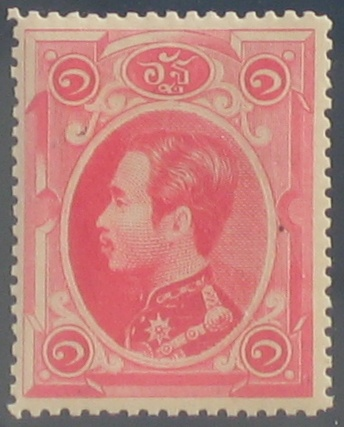
1 att, one eighth of a fueang

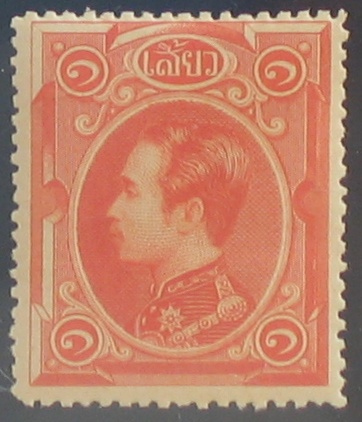
1 sio, quarter of a fueang

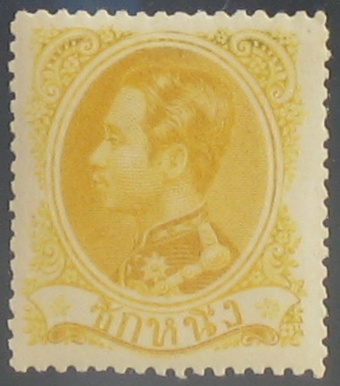
1 sik, half of a fueang

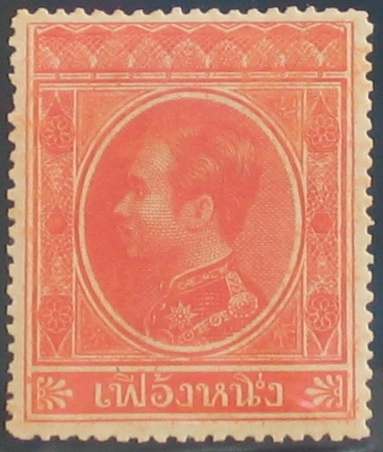
1 fueang, one eighth of a baht

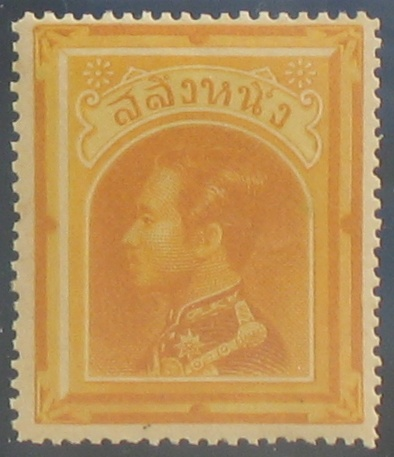
1 salueng, quarter of a baht

== See also ==
- Postage stamps and postal history of Bangkok
- Row Collection
