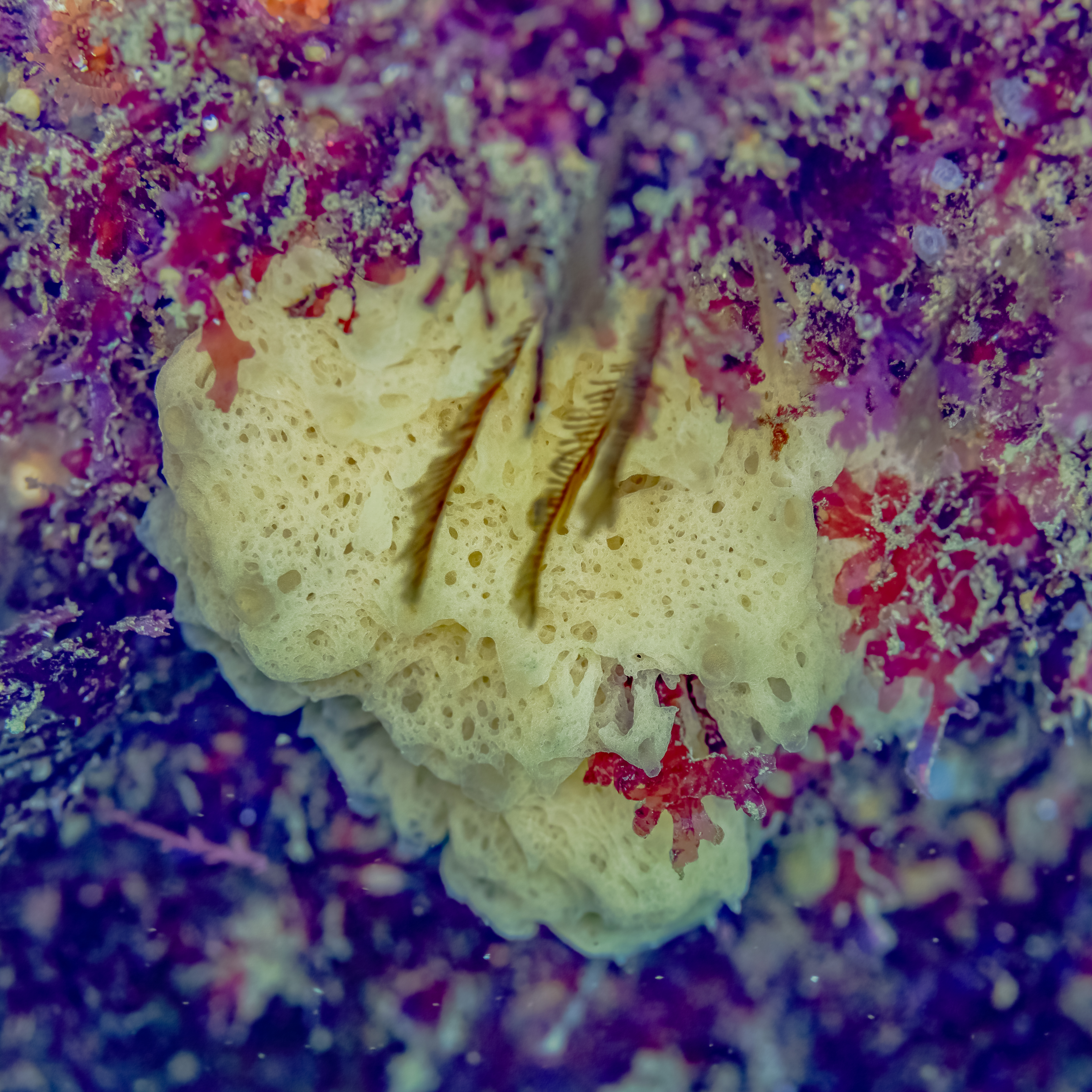

Scientific classification
- Domain: Eukaryota
- Kingdom: Animalia
- Phylum: Porifera
- Class: Calcarea
- Order: Clathrinida
- Family: Clathrinidae
- Genus: Borojevia
- Species: B. cerebrum

Binomial name
- Borojevia cerebrum (Haeckel, 1872)

Synonyms
- List: Ascaltis cerebrum Haeckel, 1872; Ascaltis decipiens Haeckel, 1872; Ascaltis gyrosa Haeckel, 1872; Clathrina cerebrum (Haeckel, 1872); Clathrina decipiens (Haeckel, 1872); Leucosolenia cerebrum (Haeckel, 1870)

= Borojevia cerebrum =

Species of sponge

Borojevia cerebrum is a species of calcareous sponge from the Mediterranean Sea. The species name refers to the brain-like appearance of the sponge.

== Description ==
As the cormus of the holotype is fragmented, it was not possible to determine its organization, or establish the presence of water-collecting tubes. In some parts, the tubes have even collapsed, and it is impossible to distinguish them. The wall of the tubes is thin, comprising an irregular meshwork of triactines, tetractines and a few tripods, which are located only on external tubes. Projecting into the interior of the tubes are the apical actines of the tetractines. Spicules are equiangular and equiradiate triactines, tetractines, and tripods. Triactines are the most abundant spicules. The size of the triactines and tetractines is uniform. The actines of the triactines are conical or cylindrical, while the tetractines are always conical. They are straight, with a blunt tip. The apical actine of the tetractines is conical, sharp, straight and thinner and shorter than the facial ones. In the distal part, before the tip of the actine, there are sharp spines arranged in 3-4 rows. These spines are directed toward the tip of the actine. Some apical actines, particularly those of young spicules, have only vestigial spines. Tripods are not abundant, as they are located only on the surface of external tubes. They are approximately the same length as the other spicules, but their actines are much more conical and stout. The centre of these spicules is frequently raised, and their tips are sharp. When the centre is not raised, they are similar to large triactines, but it is still possible to recognize them by the shape of the stout conical actines.
