= Pre-adhesive mail =

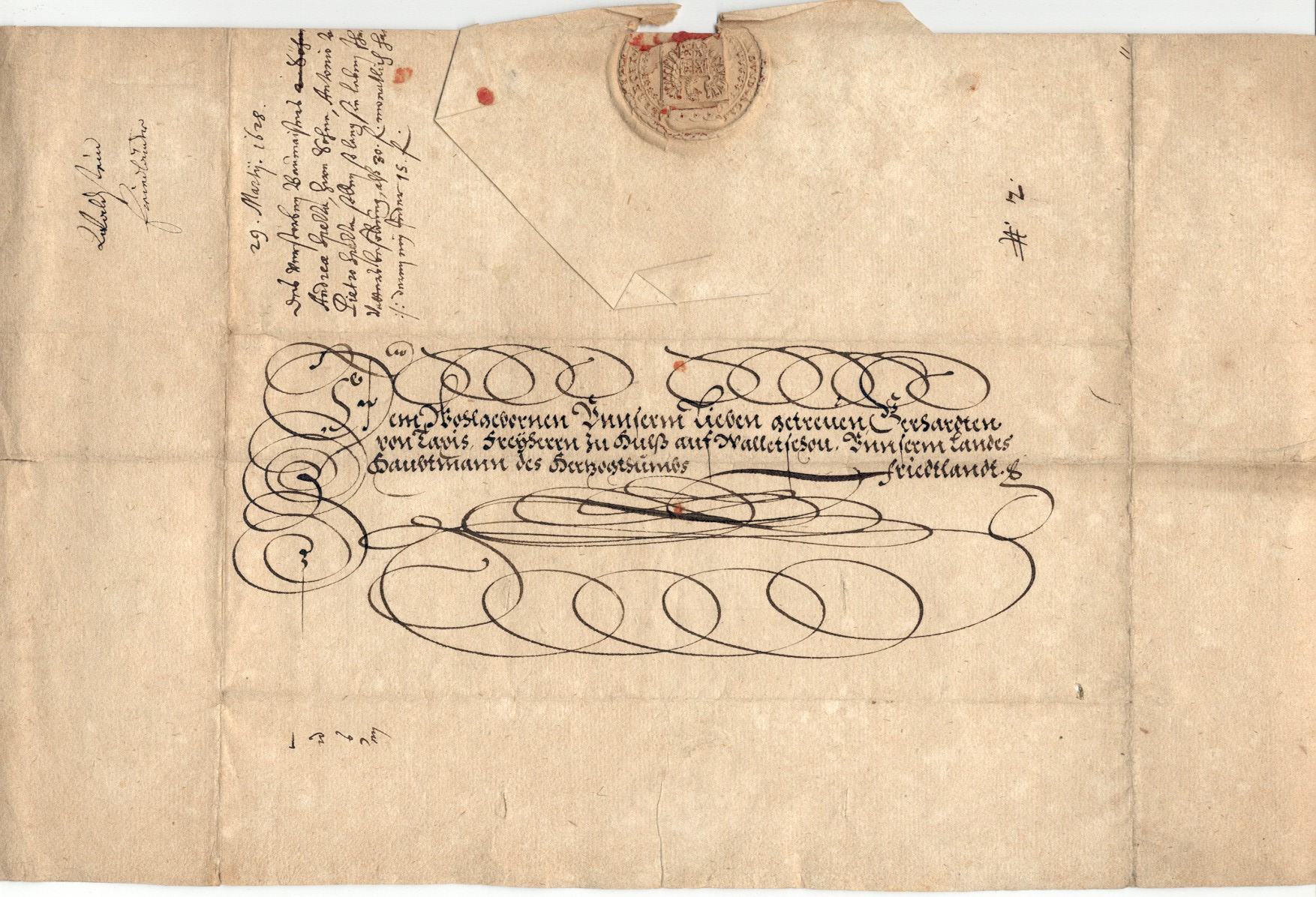
Opened up 1628 lettersheet showing folds, address and seal, with letter being written on the obverse

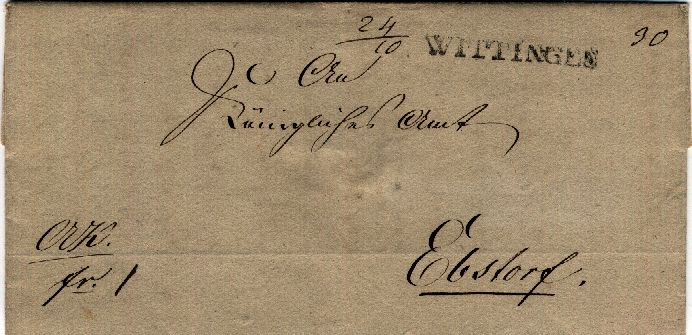
1834 pre-adhesive mail with Wittingen straight-line town handstamp to Ebsdorf

Pre-adhesive mail, also called pre-stamp mail, are letters carried in mail systems before the issuance of postage stamps. A stampless cover is another description and generally also refers to any item of mail sent before the issuance of postage stamps but it can also refer to mail sent, after the introduction of postage stamps, unpaid (as was permitted in many countries) or without the pre-payment being indicated by the affixing of a postage stamp; it could have been pre-paid in cash and marked paid.

This mail is usually a letter sheet because the use of envelopes was not popularised until after the introduction of postage stamps. Pre-adhesive mail includes court and government letters and items from the general populace before official public mail services were introduced. The mail often bears distinctive town and other marks applied worldwide.

In the United Kingdom of Great Britain and Ireland pre-adhesive mail was the norm before the Penny Black and Two Pence Blue stamps were issued for use by the General Post Office on 6 May 1840, and in other countries, to mail used prior to each country's postal administration adopted adhesive labels to indicate postage had been pre-paid.

In the United States, the majority of stampless mail was sent collect. This meant that the person receiving the letter paid the postage. This type of letter was not marked Paid. Pre-payment of postage was not mandatory in the U.S.A. until 1856. This greatly impacted small town postmasters as they were compensated based on the amount of postage they collected.
