= Heteropiidae =

Scientific classification
- Kingdom: Animalia
- Phylum: Porifera
- Class: Calcarea
- Order: Leucosolenida
- Family: Heteropiidae; Dendy, 1893

Genera
- Grantessa Lendenfeld, 1885; Heteropia Carter, 1886; Paraheteropia Borojevic, 1965; Sycettusa Haeckel, 1872; Syconessa Borojevic, Boury-Esnault & Vacelet, 2000; Vosmaeropsis Dendy, 1893

Family of sponges

Heteropiidae is a family of sea sponges in the order Leucosolenida in the class Calcarea. In a 2012 paper, Oliver Voigt, Eilika Wülfing and Gert Wörheide (2012) confirmed that the family Heteropiidae is not monophyletic.
