= Baerida =

Scientific classification
- Kingdom: Animalia
- Phylum: Porifera
- Class: Calcarea
- Subclass: Calcaronea
- Order: Baerida; Borojevic, Boury-Esnault & Vacelet, 2000

Families
- Baeriidae; Lepidoleuconidae; Petrobionidae; Trichogypsiidae

Order of sponges

Baerida is an order of sea sponges in the subclass of Calcaronea, first described in 2000 by Radovan Borojevic, Nicole Boury-Esnault and Jean Vacelet. Baerida contains four families; two of these families (Lepidoleuconidae and Petrobionidae) were formerly placed within the order Lithonida.

Species of the order Baerida are leuconoid calcareous sponges with the skeleton either composed exclusively of micro-diactines, or in which microdiactines constitute exclusively or predominantly a specific sector of the skeleton, such as choano-skeleton or atrial skeleton. Large or giant spicules are frequently present in the cortical skeleton, from which they can partially or fully invade the choanoderm. In sponges with a reinforced cortex, the inhalant pores can be restricted to a sieve-like ostia-bearing region. Dagger-shaped small tetractines (pugioles) are frequently the sole skeleton of the exhalant aquiferous system. Although the skeleton may be highly reinforced by the presence of dense layers of microdiactines in a specific region, an aspicular calcareous skeleton is not.
