= Jean Vacelet =

French marine biologist

Jean Vacelet is a French marine biologist who specialises in the underwater fauna of the Mediterranean. After earning his licence at the Faculté des Sciences de Marseille and learning to dive in 1954, he specialised in the study of sponges at the Marine station of Endoume, and there he has stayed faithful to both sponges and place for more than half a century. His research has included all aspects of sponges: taxonomy, habitat, biology, anatomy, their bacterial associations, and their place in the evolution of multi-celled animals. He has studied them not only in the Mediterranean but in the Indian Ocean and the Pacific. Exploration of underwater grottoes, together with Jacques Laborel and Jo Hamelin, revealed the existence of sponges dating from very ancient geological periods and the unexpected existence of carnivorous sponges, and surprisingly, the grottoes in some ways mimicked life at much greater depths.

He earned one doctorate in 1958 and his doctorat ès-sciences, under Professor Claude Lévi in 1964.

He, together with other colleagues, has written definitive works on Porifera (sponges), in addition to his many specific works on carnivorous sponges. And again with many colleagues, is responsible for the World Porifera Database.

He continues his researches on sponges at Endoume as emeritus professor.

== Gallery ==
from 'Global Diversity of Sponges (Porifera)'

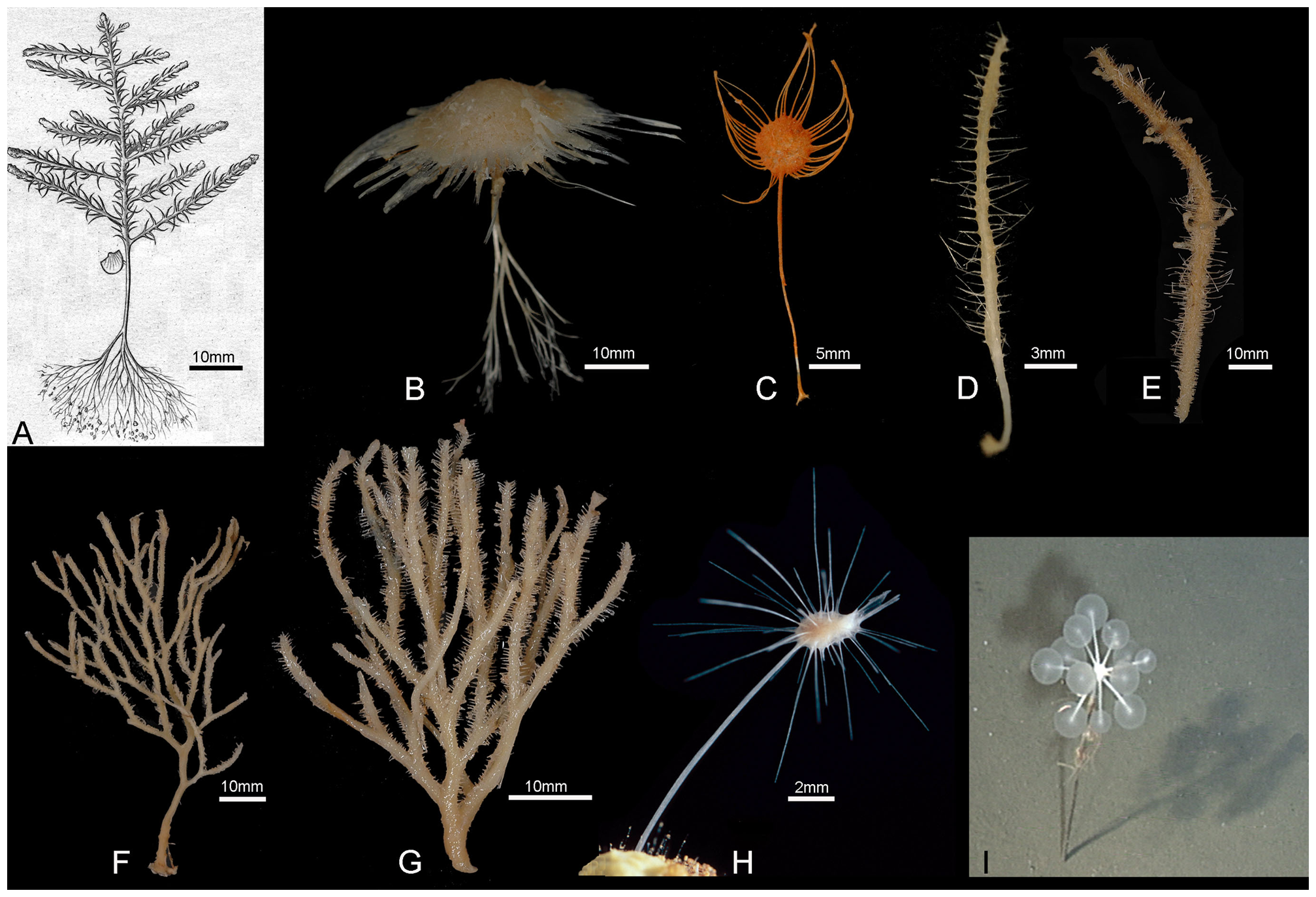
Carnivorous sponge diversity

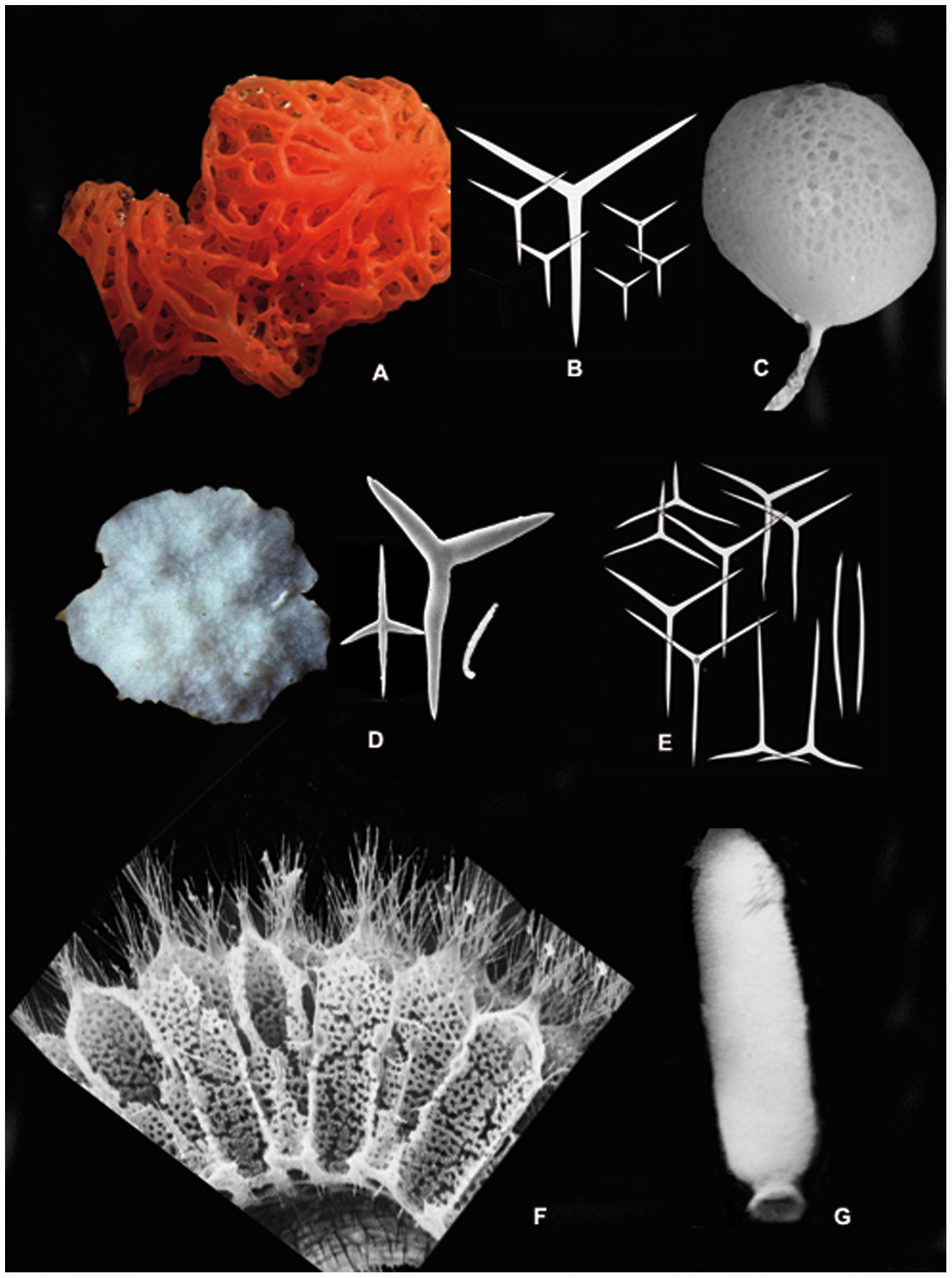
Calcarea diversity

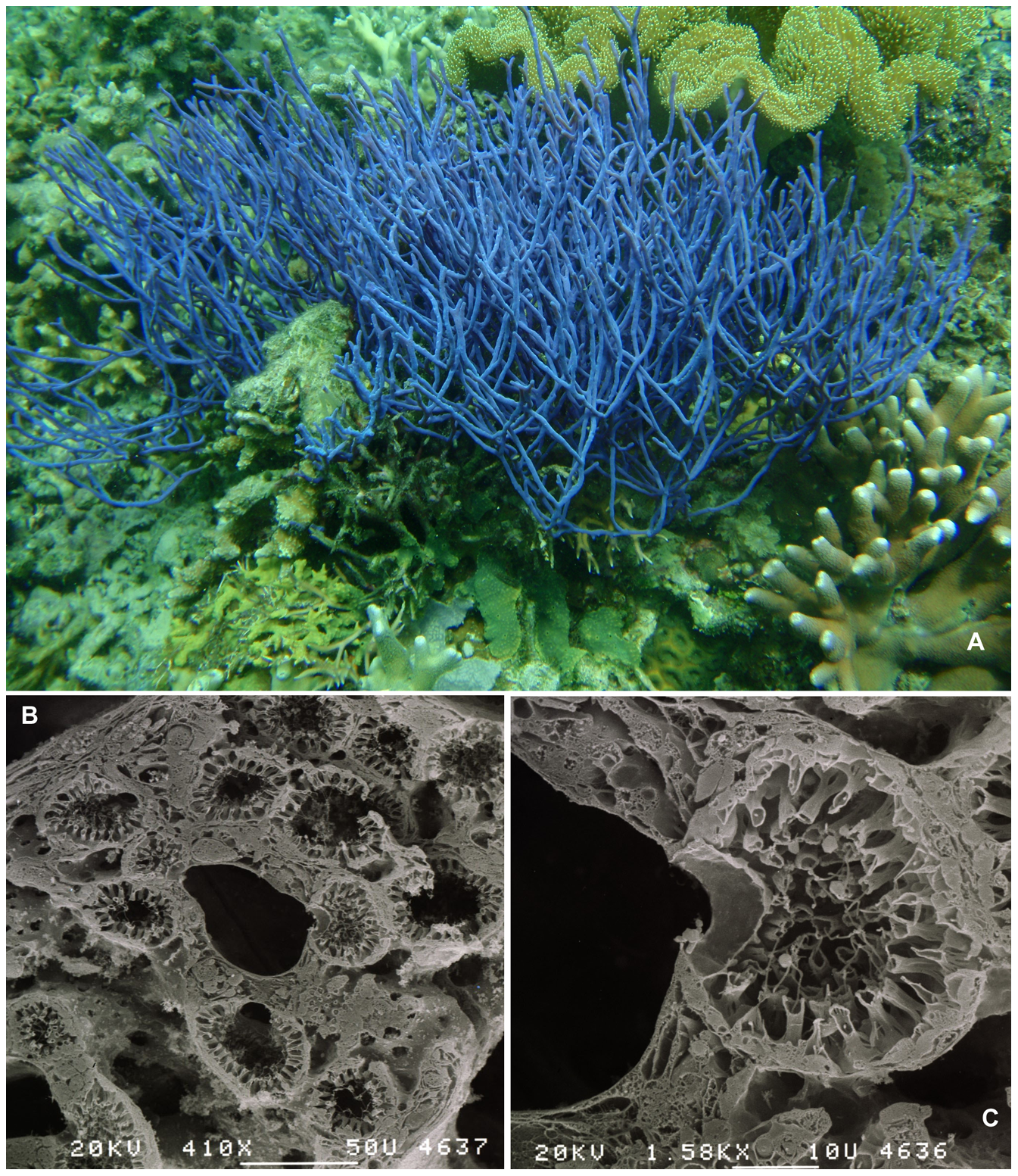
Porifera morphology

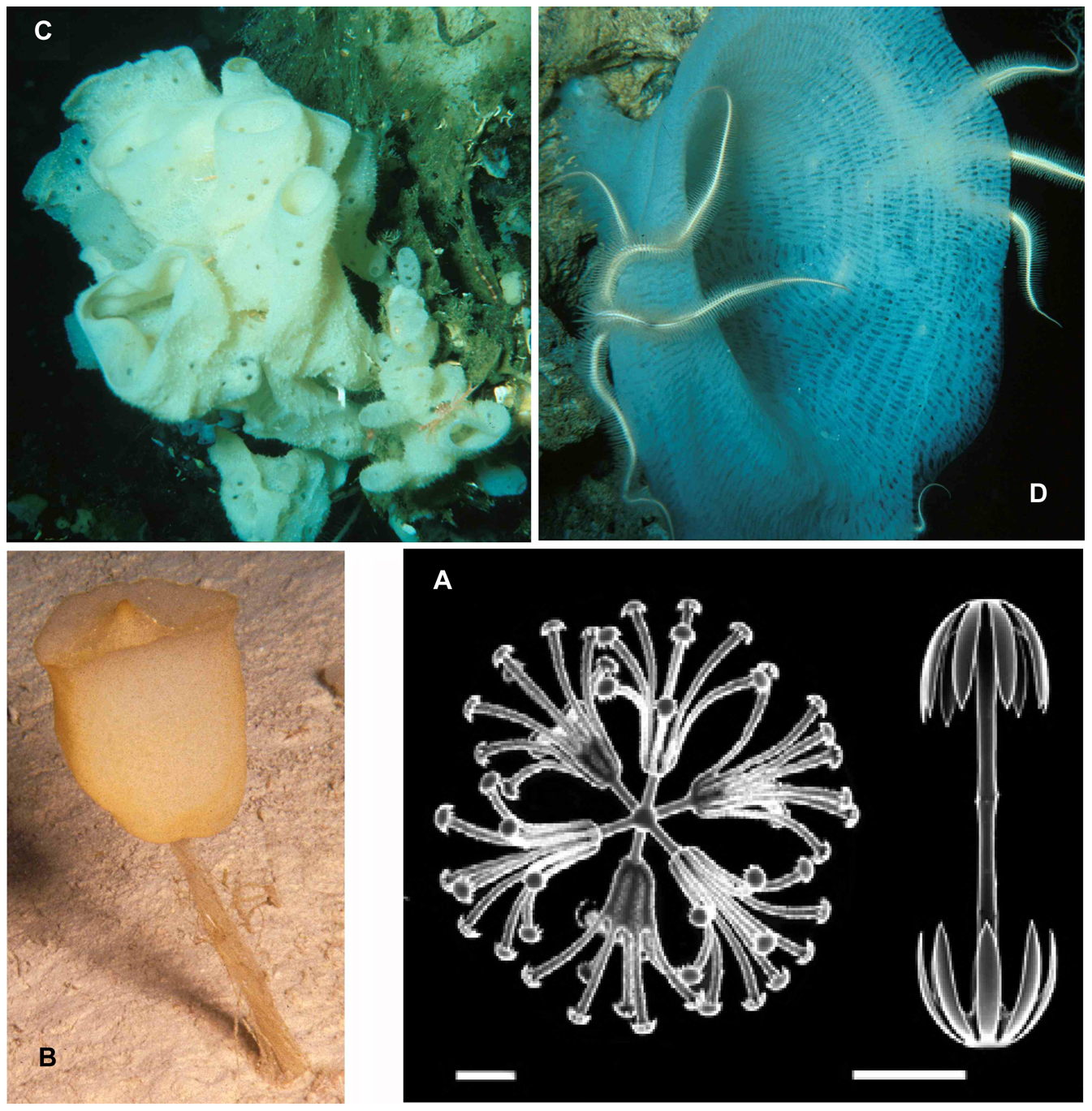
Hexactinellida diversity

(Source)

== Awards ==
- Médaille Prince Albert 1er de Monaco( Prix Mansley-Bendall), 1991.
- Prix Savigny (Académie des Sciences de Paris), 1994.
- Prix des Sciences de la Mer, Académie des Sciences. 2001

== See also ==
- Taxa named by Jean Vacelet
