= Nicole Boury-Esnault =

French researcher of marine sponges

Academic work
- Discipline: Marine biology
- Sub-discipline: Spongiology
- Institutions: Aix-Marseille University

Nicole Boury-Esnault is a retired French researcher of sponges, formerly at Centre d'Océanologie de Marseille, Aix-Marseille University.

== Research ==
In 1995, Nicole Boury-Esnault and Jean Vacelet discovered a species of carnivorous sponges of the genus Asbestopluma, during an exploration of a shallow cave in the Mediterranean. Caves can recapitulate the environment of the deep sea-bed due to the darkness and lack of nutrient, permitting the study of deep-sea-like regions in shallow areas of water. Carnivorous sponges, lacking the normal filter feeding apparatus, had been previously discovered during deep-sea trawls and presumed to be damaged since they did not have a known feeding mechanism. The discovery of members of the family in shallow water meant that they could be experimentally tested, which is when Boury-Esnault and Vacelet observed feeding on small crustaceans. Later they also reported on a member of the genus which used both carnivory and methanotrophy to survive in deep-sea expeditions of the Barbados trench.

Boury-Esnault and Vacelet also found hexactinellid (glass) sponges, another deep-sea species, in these shallow cave waters, permitting detailed study for the first time. She led a collaboration with Oceana and the University of Victoria which found new glass sponges in the Mediterranean Sea, and in the Atlantic Ocean. In 1997 Boury-Esnault and Klaus Rutzler published a 'Thesaurus of Sponge Morphology' with the Smithsonian Institution. In 2012 Boury-Esnault was involved in a study capturing the number and diversity of sponges in seas all around the world.

== Publications ==
=== Books ===
- NATO Advanced Research Workshop on Taxonomy of Porifera from the N.E. Atlantic and Mediterranean Sea (1986 : Marseille, France); Vacelet, Jean; Boury-Esnault, Nicole; SpringerLink (Online service) (29 June 2013), Taxonomy of Porifera: from the N.E. Atlantic and Mediterranean Sea, Springer-Verlag (published 1987), ISBN 978-3-642-70892-3

== See also ==
- Taxa named by Nicole Boury-Esnault
