= Joseph Hackmey =

Joseph D. Hackmey
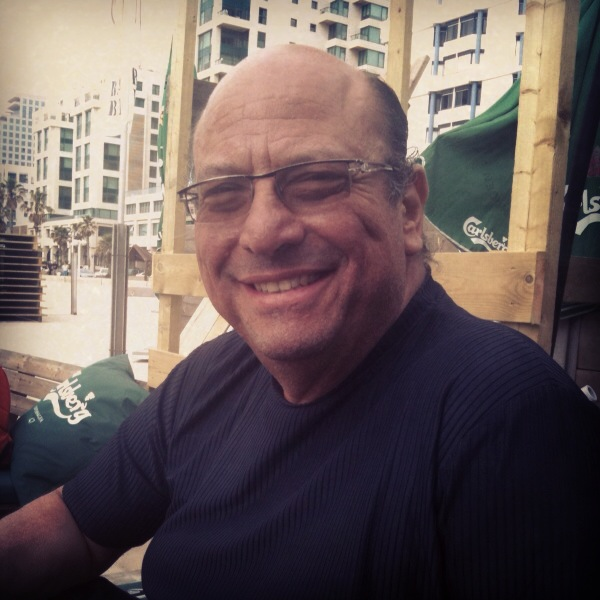
- Occupations: Chairman, Hackmey group

Joseph D. Hackmey (Hebrew: יוסף דוד חכמי) is an Israeli businessman, insurance company executive, actuary, investor, and an art and stamp collector. Art News listed Hackmey as one of the 200 biggest art collectors in the world. He was the chairman of Phoenix Insurance. Chairman of the Israeli Insurance Association and Chairman of the Israeli Life Offices Association.

== Biography ==
Joseph Hackmey is a fifth-generation Israeli. His paternal grandfather, Joseph Hackmey Shvili, directed Barclays bank when it was the largest bank in Mandatory Palestine; his maternal grandfather, Moshe Carasso, was a prominent businessman in Palestine. Hackmey's father, David, established an assurance agency in 1943, when he was 24 years old; in 1949, he turned his assurance agency into an assurance company; at the time, his partners were the English Phoenix Assurance Company and the Israel Discount Bank.

Hackmey was born in Tel Aviv, to a Sephardi-Jerusalemite family on his father's side and a Sephardi-Greek-Italian family on his mother's. His sister, Nitza Kanfer, is 12 years younger than he.

Hackmey attended boarding schools in Switzerland. He earned a baccalaureate in mathematics at M.I.T. in 1964, then continued his studies at the same institution and earned a master's degree in electrical engineering in 1965, at the age of 20. In 1967, the Hebrew University of Jerusalem awarded him an honorary postgraduate diploma in actuarial science and business administration. Hackmey received a second master's degree, in Judaic Studies from New York University, in 2013.

Hackmey knows seven languages.

== Business career ==
Hackmey commenced his insurance career in 1968 with the Israel Phoenix Assurance company. After seven years he was appointed by the board of directors as chief executive officer of the Phoenix. Four years after he appointed as CEO the Phoenix profits multiplied by five times. He was elected chairman of the Israeli Insurance Association twice and Chairman of the Israeli Life Offices Association twice. When his father died in 1991, Hackmey succeeded him as the Chairman of Israel Phoenix. In 2002 Hackmey and his sister sold their stake of 56.8% in the Israel Phoenix Assurance company, for 314 million US$. At the time, it was the third largest insurance company in Israel. It was sold to the brothers in law, Ya'akov Shahar and Israel Kez, the importers of Volvo cars to Israel and the owners of Maccabi Haifa football team.

== Art collection ==
In 1994, a London-based art news magazine named Hackmey "Art Collector of the year". The Israel Phoenix corporate collection, consisting of 2,200 items, most of them paintings and a small quantity of sculptures, was estimated in 2002 to be worth 216 million shekels. The international collection included Picasso, Matisse, Robert Rauschenberg, Barnett Newman, Jasper Johns, Jean Dubuffet, Mark Rothko. The Israeli collection included Reuven Rubin, Yehezkel Streichman, Arie Aroch, Joseph Zaritsky, Yitzhak Danziger, Marcel Janco, Mordecai Ardon, Aviva Uri, Raffi Lavie, Avigdor Stematsky.

Professor Mordechai Omer, director of the Tel Aviv Museum of Art, studied the collection and published a selection of it in a 600-page book. In 1998 Tel Aviv Museum of Art organized an exhibition which included 300 items from the collection.

Hackmey also possesses a large personal collection of international art and Israeli art, including a special collection of young Israeli artists.

== Philately ==
Hackmey is a philatelist. He has an extensive collection of Ceylon and New Zealand Commonwealth stamps and was presented with an International Award in recognition for his work. Hackmey owns a 11 November 1858 issue of Romanian newspaper Zimbrul și Vulturul. The item bears eight rare Romanian cap de bour ("Bull's Head") stamps, issued by the principality of Moldova in 1858. He won the Grand Prix National and a Large Gold Medal at the Efiro 2008 in Bucharest for his exhibit Classical Romania. He also owned a May 1851 cover. Hackmey also owns a collection of Switzerlands classic issues which is, together with the Schaefer and Senn collections, considered to be one of the best still-complete modern day collections in its field.

He also won Grand Prix medals at the World Philatelic Exhibitions, Istanbul 1996, Israel 1998, Israel 2008, and was a candidate for the Grand Prix in Washington, 2006.

Hackmey is a Fellow of the Royal Philatelic Society, London and a member of the Collectors Club of New York. In 1999 he has signed th Roll of Distinguished Philatelists In 2010 he was elected an associate foreign member of the Académie de philatélie, Paris.

== Philanthropy ==
The Bnai Brith International organization awarded Hackmey the "Bnai Brith International Humanitarian award". In 2009 he received an honorary doctorate degree from the Tel Aviv University in recognition of his various contributions to Israeli society, including art, music and culture.

Hackmey is a member of the board of governors of the Weizmann Institute of Science, the Israel Museum, the Tel Aviv Museum, the Tel Aviv University, the Hebrew University of Jerusalem, the Israeli Opera, the Israeli Philharmonic Orchestra, and is a member of the International Council of the Tate Gallery of London. He served as the Chairman of the Israeli Chess Association, and during his chairmanship, the number of Israeli international chess grandmasters had increased from 5 to 29.

He established Hackmey Hebrew Classical Library, joined by its two world-famous predecessors at Harvard University Press – the Loeb Classical Library. It offers two classical texts in facing-page translation: Hebrew and Aramaic.

== See also ==
- Zimbrul și Vulturul
- Visual arts in Israel
