= Flag and coat of arms of Moldavia =

Symbols of the former Romanian principality

Flag of Moldavia
- Romanian: Cap de bour
- Use: State and war flag
- Design: Modern reconstruction of a Moldavian princely standard (attested versions of the number and general aspects of symbols other than the aurochs vary considerably)

Coat of arms of Moldavia
- Armiger: The Prince of Moldavia
- Shield: Gules, aurochs sable/or, rose, and crescent argent/or, five pointed star or
- Modern reconstruction of the Moldavian coat of arms (attested versions of the field tincture and number and general aspects of symbols other than the aurochs vary considerably)

The flag and coat of arms of Moldavia, one of the two Danubian Principalities, together with Wallachia, which formed the basis for the Romanian state, were subject to numerous changes throughout their history.

== History ==
The recognised emblem belonging to the land of Moldavia, and perpetuated over the centuries as the official sign of the country, is the ancient aurochs's head with a star between its horns. The aurochs's head is flanked to the right by a sun (or rather a flower, the heraldic rose) and to the left by a waning crescent moon. When and under what circumstances this representation appeared as a symbol of the country is not known, but scholars consider that the emblem existed before the foundation of the independent Moldavian feudal state by Bogdan I, in 1359. The oldest remaining representations of the coat of arms of Moldavia are the seals and coins dating from the reign of Petru Mușat (1375 - 1391). Traian Bița however observes that the legend (the text running around the perimeter) on the coins suggests the aurochs's head was originally the arms of the ruling dynasty, becoming the state's arms only during the rule of Stephen the Great. Consequently, the original state arms of Moldavia was a split shield, with a barry of six or seven on dexter and two to seven fleur-de-lis on sinister. Over the centuries, the image of the aurochs's head had undergone a constant evolution, being occasionally replaced by the wisent's head, so that by the middle of the 19th century, the image of the wisent came to be used more often.

The Moldavian state coat of arms (aurochs's head) differs from the Moldavian dynastic coat of arms (both with the initial elements and with its elements of various origins, some of them added over time to the shield). The state coat of arms was used on the great princely seal, coins, flags, some public buildings, and various other objects (princely sealing rings, battle or parade swords, etc.), while the dynastic coat of arms was also used on coins, but especially in circumstances related more to the particular life of the Moldavian voivodes (on church or monastery inscriptions, tombstones, bells, manuscripts, or personal belongings of the prince and members of his family).

Traditionally, two insignia have persisted constantly on the Moldavian flags: the head of the aurochs, as the symbol of the Moldavian state, and Saint George, as the ecclesiastical heraldic symbol of Moldavia. A princely standard was first attested under the rule of Prince Stephen the Great (late 15th century), displaying an enthroned Saint George set against a cherry background. The depiction of the Battle of Baia (1476) in Johannes de Thurocz's Chronicle shows Moldavian troops carrying a pennant with the aurochs's head on pales of unspecified colour. According to a well-known historical source, the princely flag of Stephen the Great worn during a ceremony in 1485 was described as the "great flag of red silk, beautifully reproducing in gold the coat of arms of the Land of Moldavia" ("Banderium quoque magnum sericeum coloris rubri, in quo arma Terrae Moldaviae pulchre auro depicta erant"). In 1574, Moldavian delegates to the coronation of Henry III of Poland are attested to have carried a blue banner with the aurochs head.

Moldavia's fall under Ottoman Empire control, a process which was accelerated during the 16th century, saw a decline in flag usage; as princes became appointees of the sultans, the usage of a sandjak as a mark of authority became widespread.

In the coat of arms (either seal or blazon), the aurochs was initially a crest over a helmet and party per pale escutcheon, charged with either fleur-de-lis dexter and bars sinister (interpreted as being alternating vert and or) or the Patriarchal cross dexter (closely resembling the Cross of Lorraine in usual renditions) and fleur-de-lis sinister. In time reduced to the simple depiction of an aurochs's head on escutcheon, it was featured alongside the arms of Wallachia and Transylvania on Michael the Brave's seal, as well as only alongside Wallachia's on various symbols favored by rulers such as Radu Mihnea and several Phanariotes (in the latter case, it was more often than not accompanied by the double-headed eagle of Byzantine tradition).

The prevalent gules (or red) and or (yellow) display was replaced, towards the beginning of the 19th century, by variations on a red-blue theme. As such, when the Treaty of Adrianople allowed Wallachia and Moldavia a measure of sovereignty, Sultan Mahmud II awarded Moldavia a red over blue pennant to be used by its military, and Wallachia a yellow over blue one; Moldavia's pennant was similar to the version given recognition by Austria-Hungary as the Landesfarben of Bukovina (the latter was blue over red).

During the Organic Statute rule of Mihail Sturdza, the pennant was replaced by a war flag/naval ensign and a civil ensign with a blue field and a red canton standing for Ottoman suzerainty. Grigore Alexandru Ghica was to include the color yellow, already present in the pan-Romanian horizontal tricolour favored by the 1848 revolutionaries, in the war flag's pattern. In 1858, the aurochs became the central theme of the most valuable stamp in Romanian postal history, the Cap de Bour.

The aurochs head (dexter) and Wallachia's eagle (sinister) were included as emblems on the tricolour adopted by Alexandru Ioan Cuza after the union of the Danubian Principalities in 1859; the arms of Moldavia are nowadays represented in the coat of arms of Romania, as well as in that of the short-lived Moldavian Democratic Republic and present-day Moldova (having previously featured in the coat of arms of Bessarabia within the Russian Empire).

== Gallery ==
=== Coat of arms ===
Seal of Petru II of Moldavia. 1387

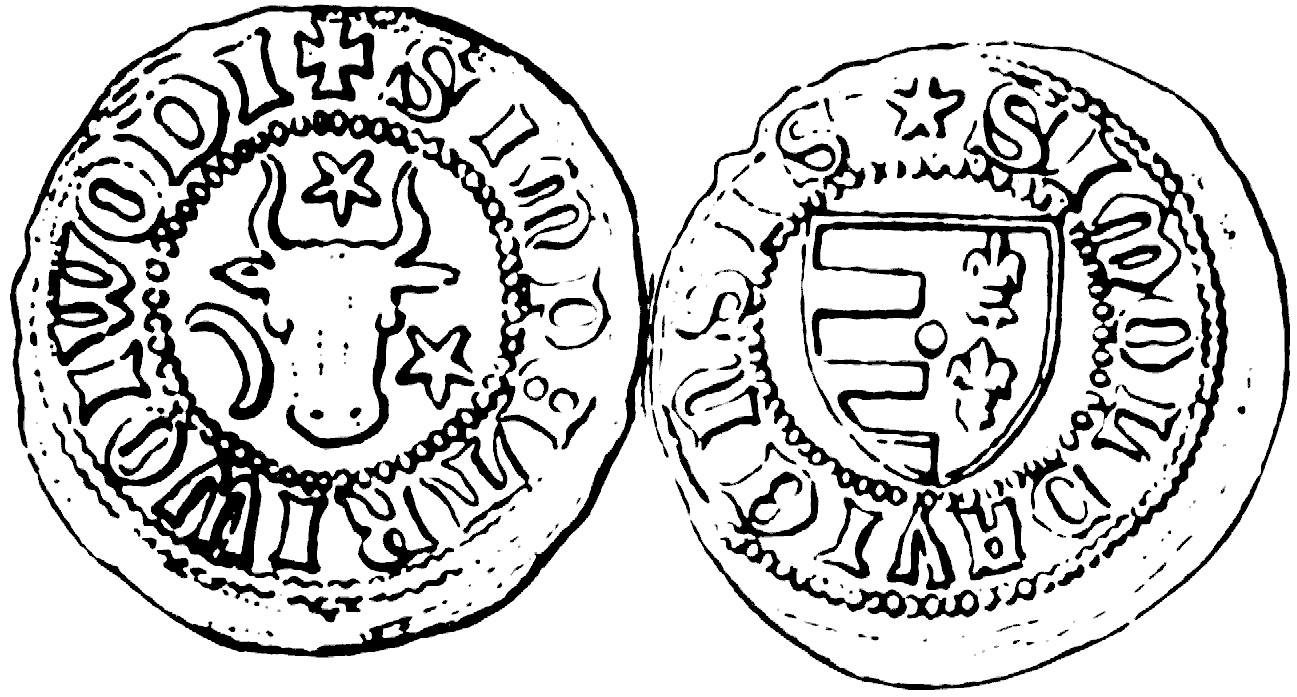
Coins of Petru Muşat (Voivode of Moldavia 1375–1391)

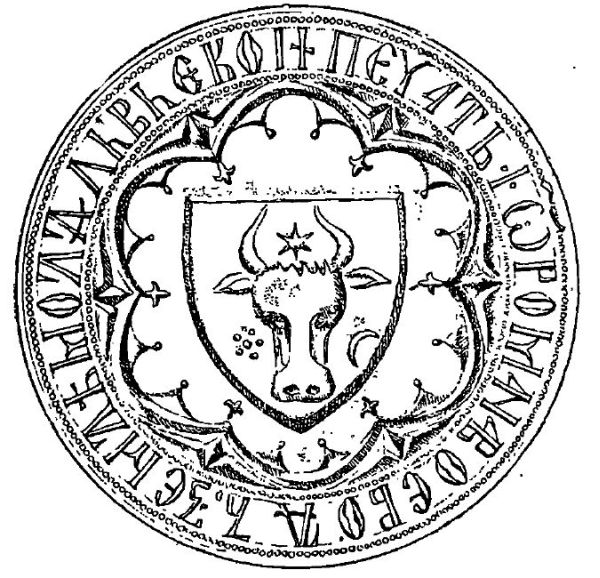
Seal of Roman I of Moldavia. 1392

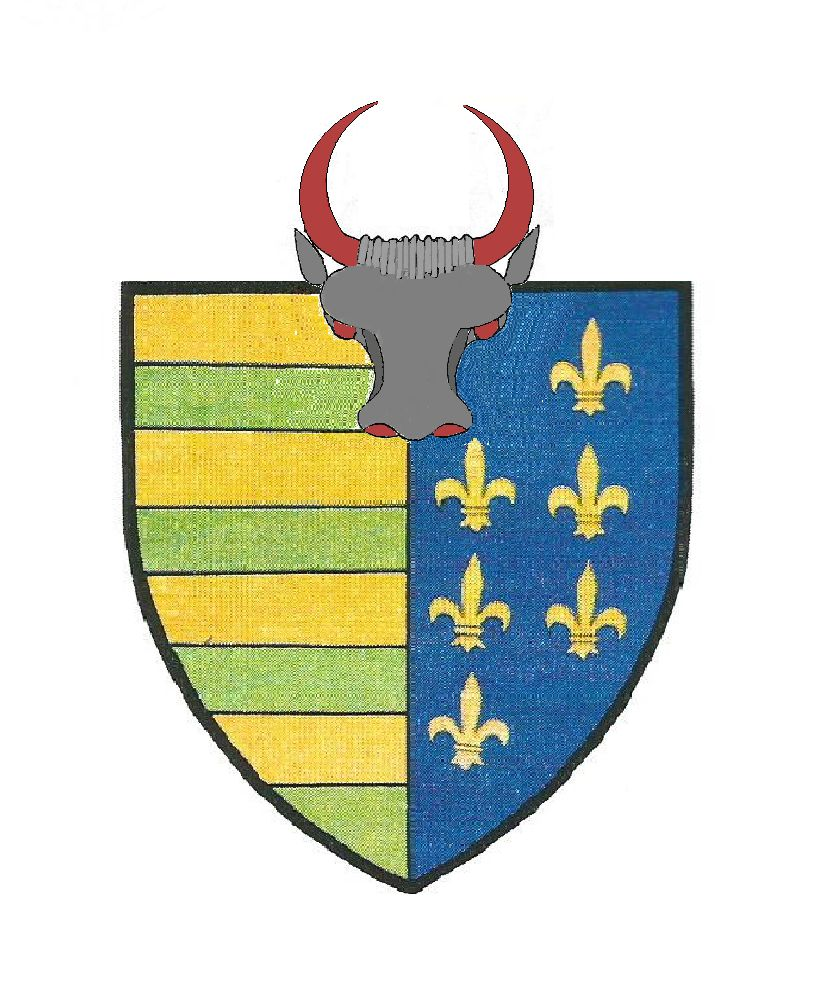
Personal coat of arms of Alexander I of Moldavia (1400–1432)

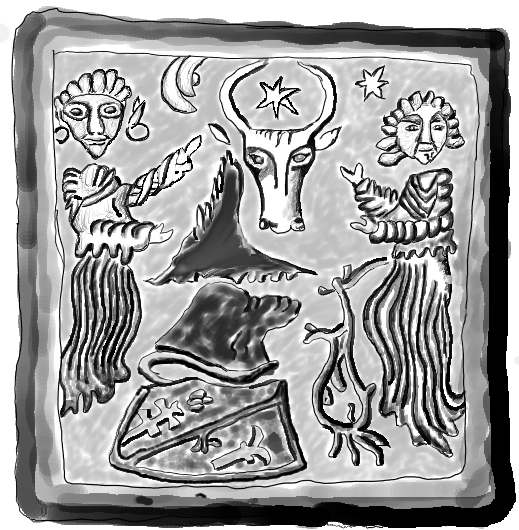
Outline of an image on stove remains excavated at the Piatra Neamț Fortress, showing the aurochs coat of arms of Moldavia

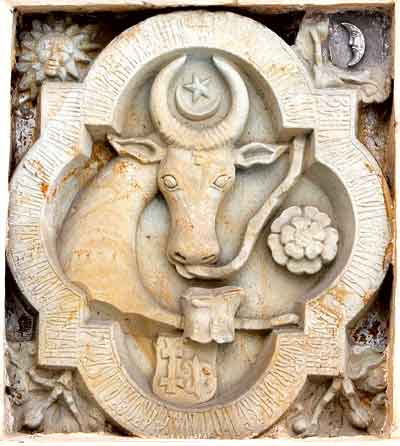
Coat of arms of Moldavia in 1481, carved on the walls of the Putna Monastery

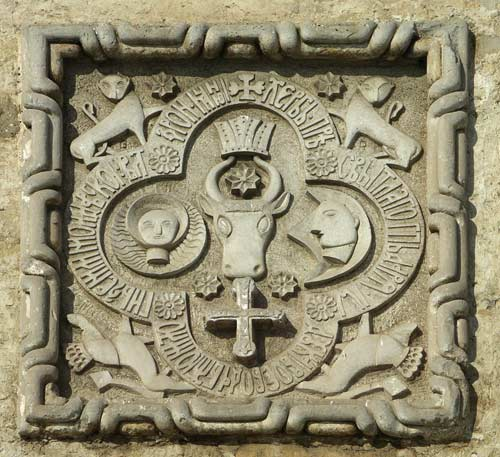
Moldavian coat-of-arms, carved on the walls of Cetățuia Monastery in Iași.

Drawing of the coat of arms with the seal of Stephen the Great. 1457

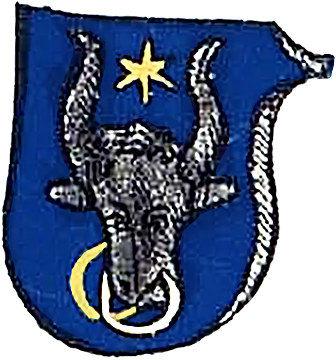
Coat of arms from the Polish Statute of Jan Laski. 1506

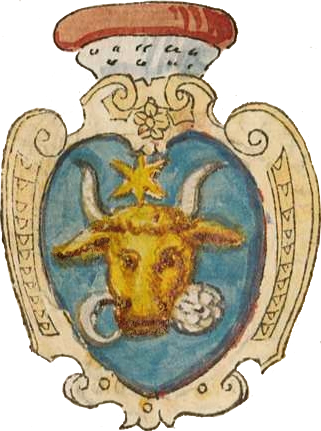
Coat of Arms of Moldavia from Großes Wappenbuch. Circa 1586

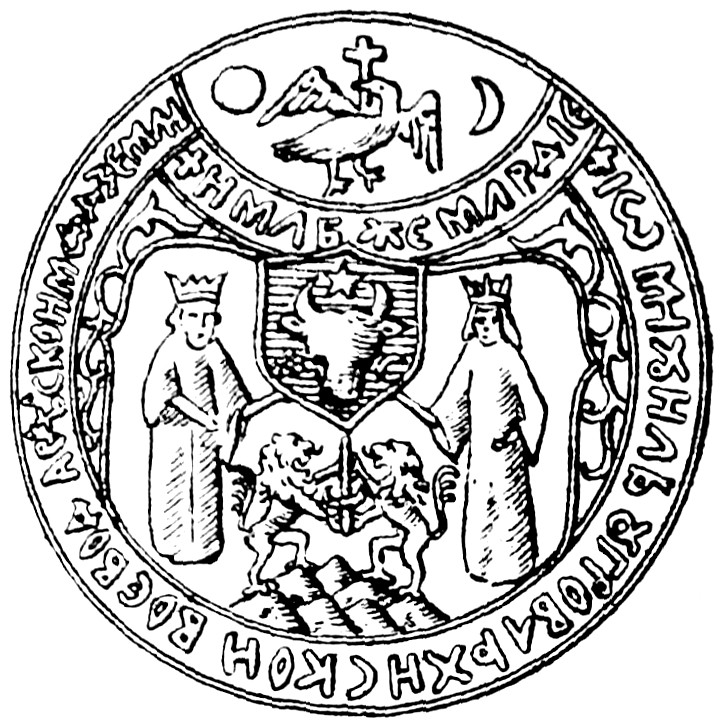
Seal of Michael the Brave (showing the arms of Wallachia, Moldavia and Transylvania, as well as the stylised figures of Michael and his son)

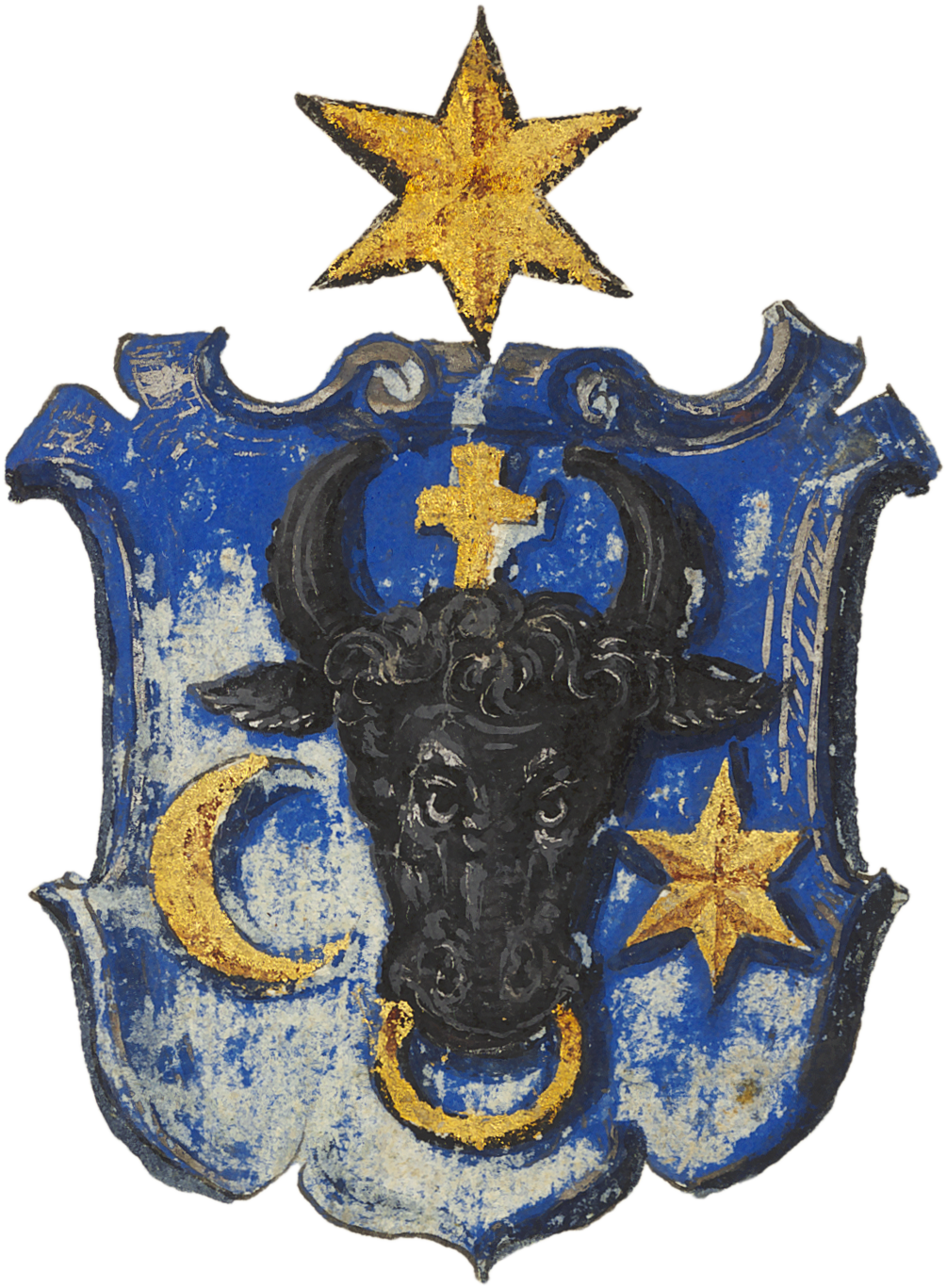
Coat of arms of the Moldavian prince Iacob Heraclid

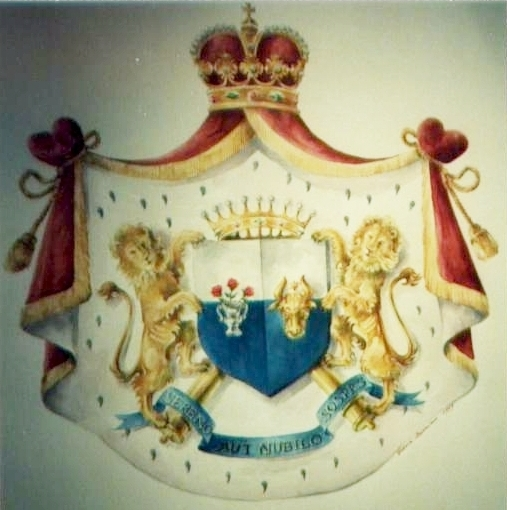
Coat of arms of the Rosetti family.

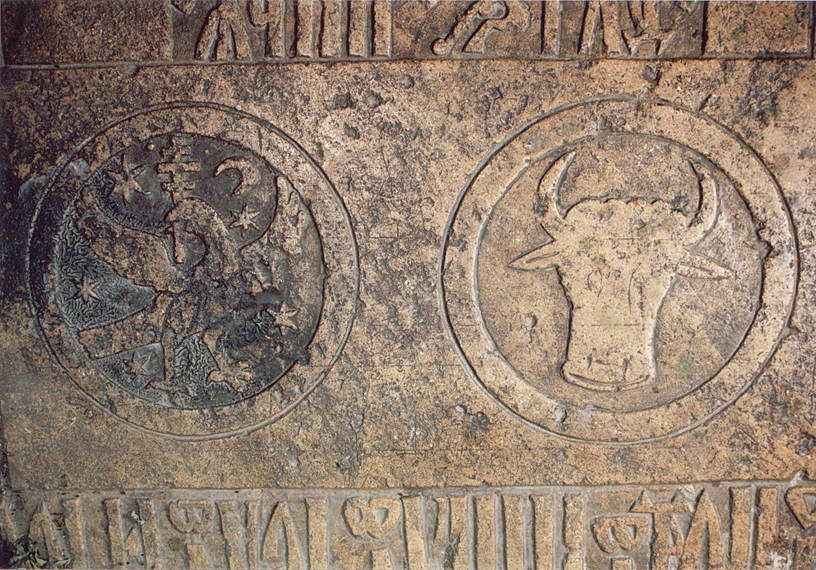
Radu Mihnea's tombstone with the coats of arms of Wallachia and Moldavia (detail)

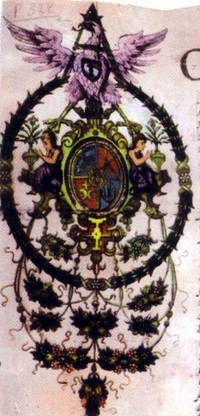
Elaborate arms of the Movilești princely family, featuring Moldavia's coat of arms and colour theme

Coat of arms of the Principality of Moldavia. 1643

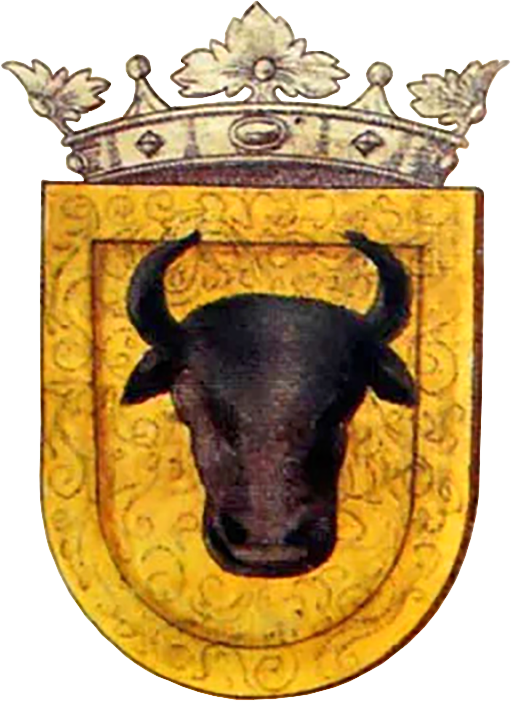
Coat of arms of Moldavia from "Stemmatographia". 1702

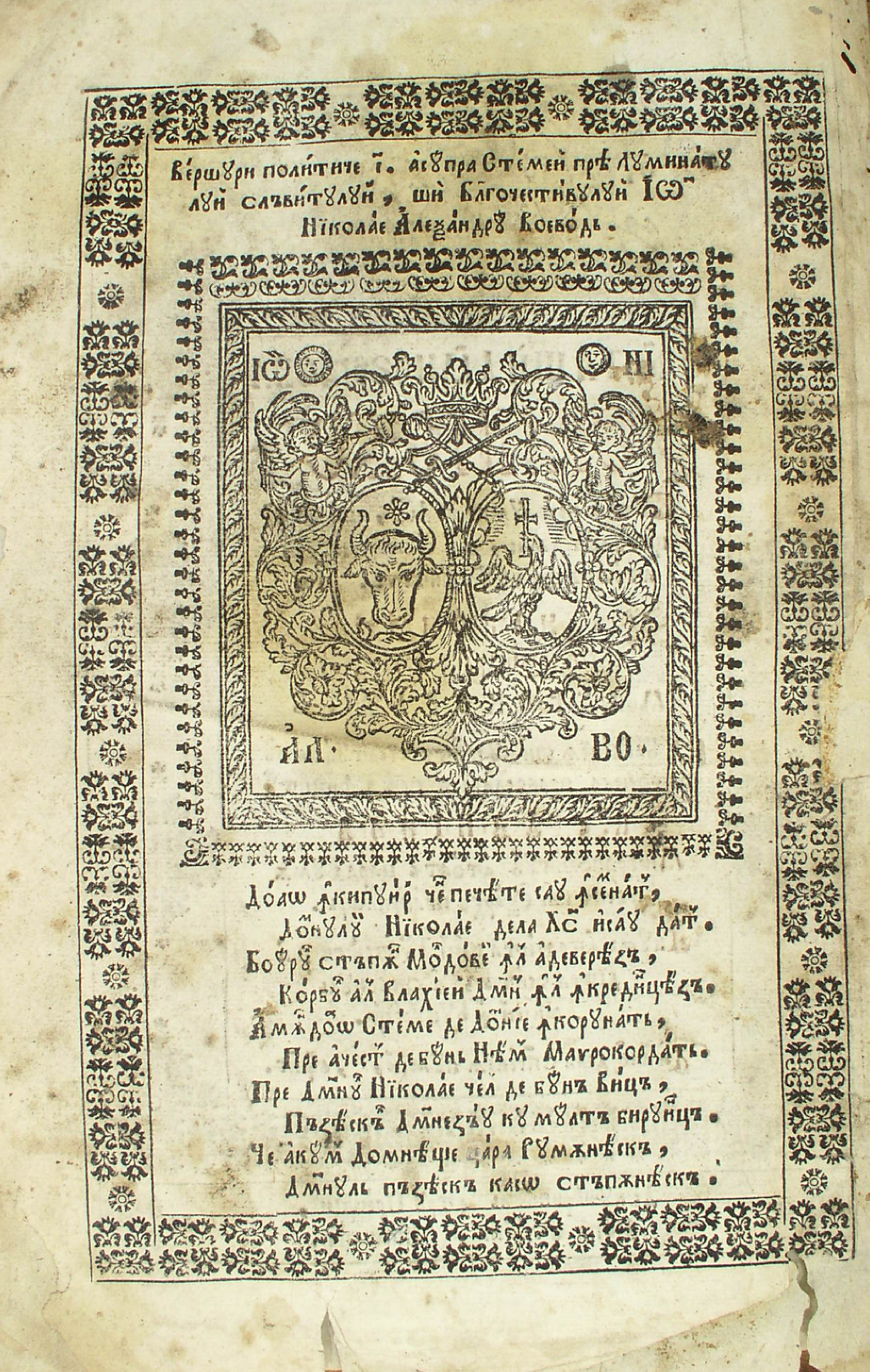
p. 2 of the Gospel Book (1723) printed during the reign of Nicholas Mavrocordatos. It shows the coats of arms of Moldavia (left) and Wallachia (right).

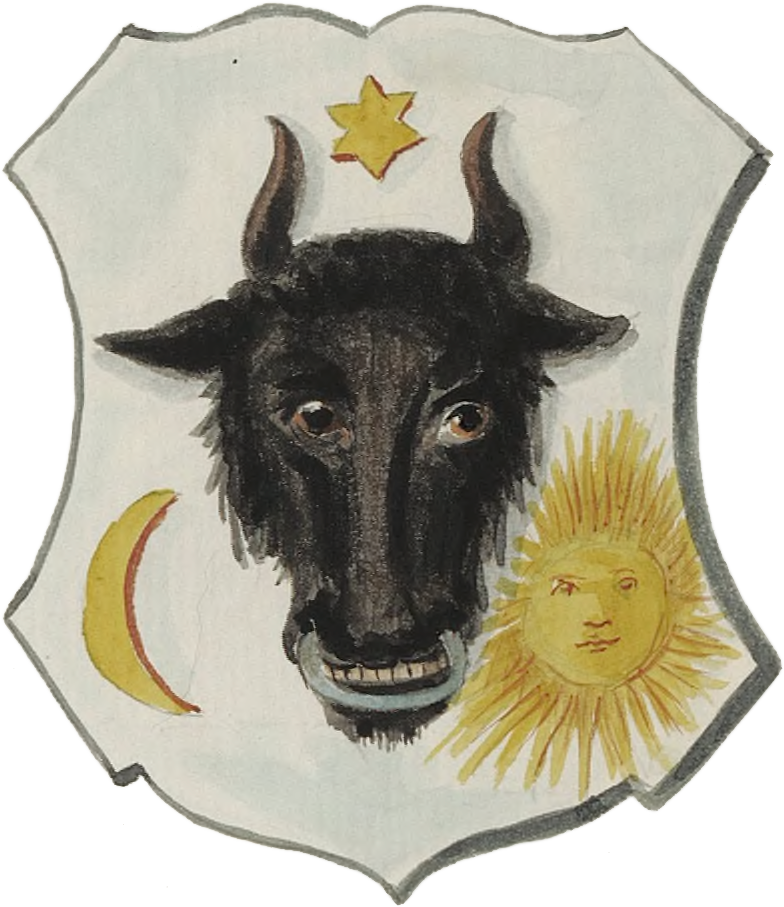
Coat of arms of Volosh Voivodeship (Moldavian Principality). 19th century

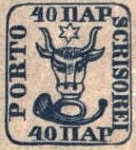
Cap de Bour stamp.

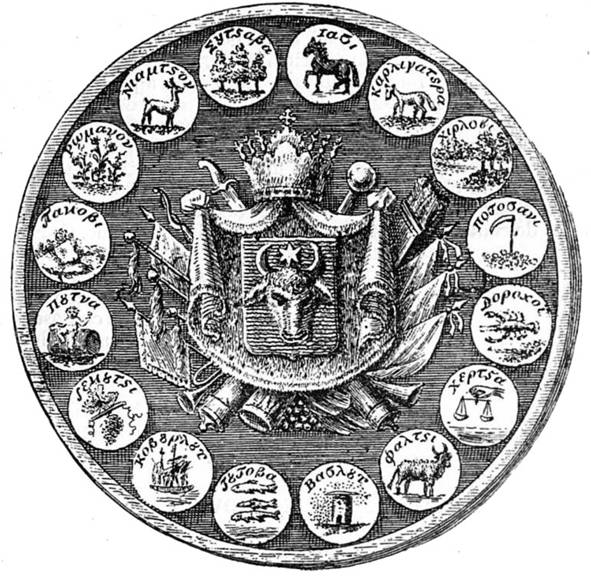
Coat of arms of Moldavia during the times of Alexander Mourouzis, 1806–1807.

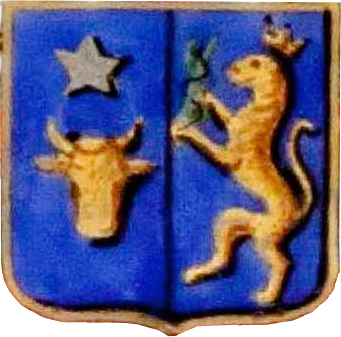
Coat of arms of Mihail Sturdza. After 1834

CoA from Flag of the Moldavian Army 1849

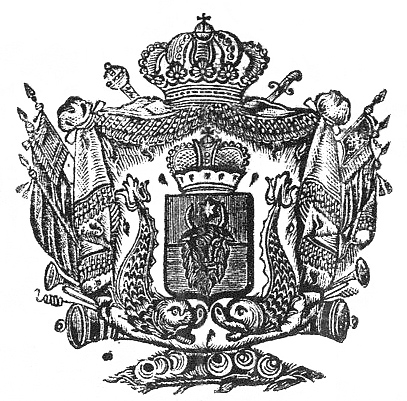
The image of the coat of arms on the passport of a citizen of the Moldavian principality. 1855

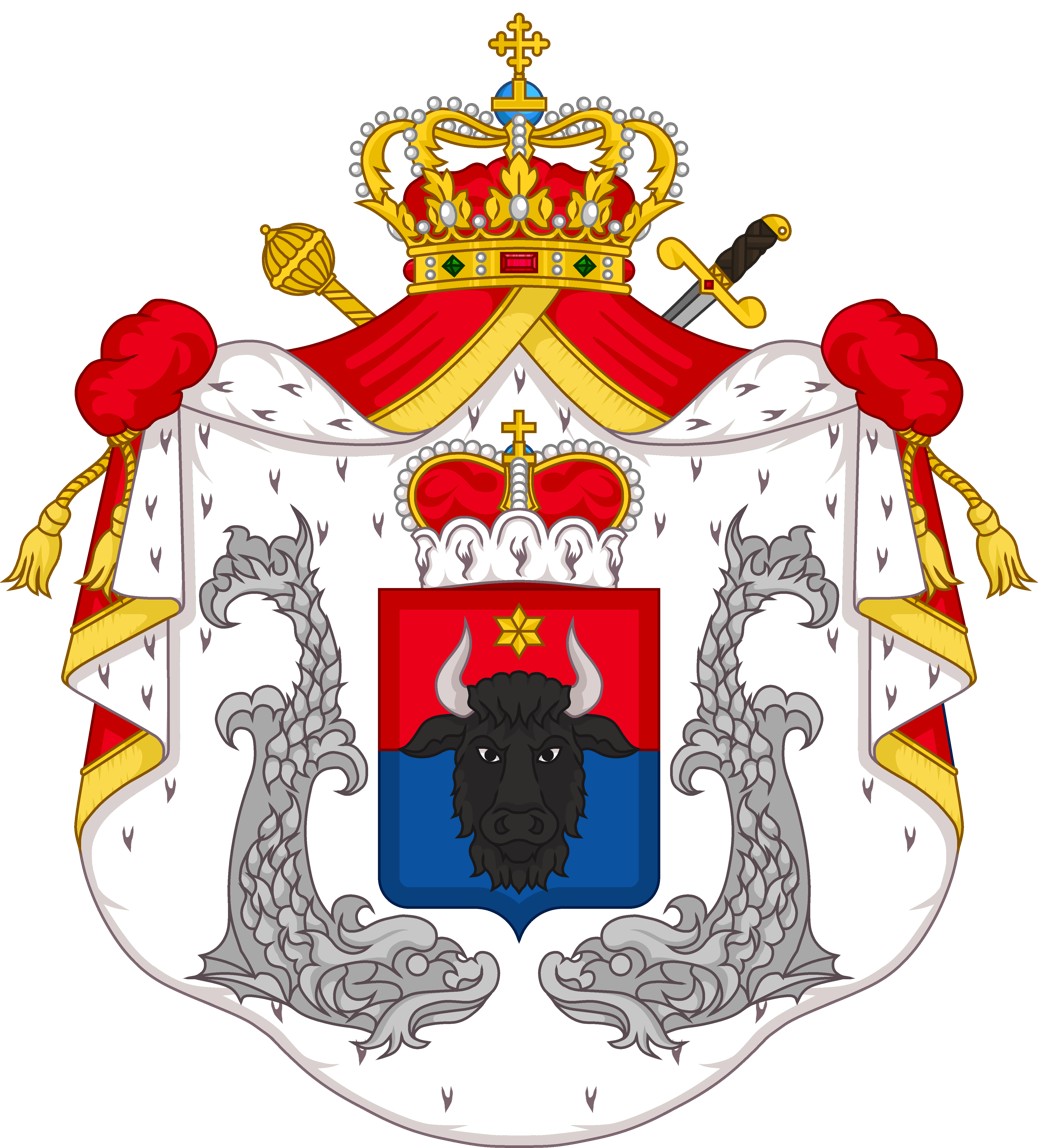
Drawing of the coat of arms of the Principality of Moldavia in the 19th century

=== Flag ===
Moldavian flag in the Battle of Baia

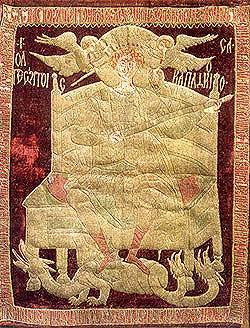
The khorugv of Stephen the Great. The original flag is in the collection of the National Museum of Romanian History.

Moldavian banner at the Battle of Obertyn. 1531

Flag of the Moldavian principality, described by Alexander Guagnini. Around 1574

Moldavian Banner under Prince Ieremia Movilă. 1601

Banner of the Moldavian cavalry of the 17th century.

Official colors according to the Organic Regulations of 1831

Civil ensign of the Principality of Moldavia in 1834–1861

The flag of the Moldavian port militia as described in 1858

Flag of Infantry Battalion of the Principality of Moldavia 1834 (Graphic reconstruction)

Flag of Infantry Battalion of the Principality of Moldavia 1849 (Graphic reconstruction)

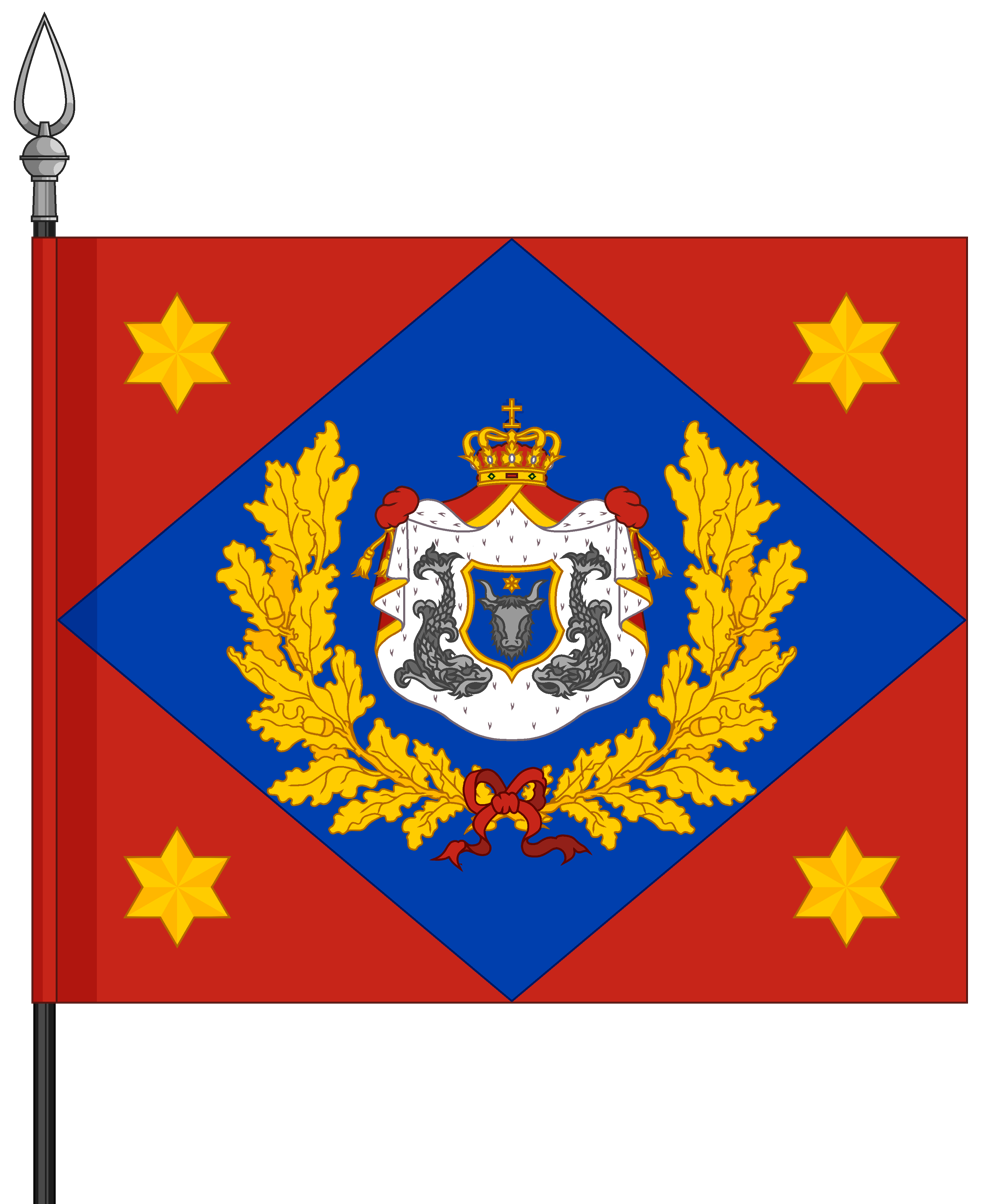
War flag of the Principality of Moldavia 1856-1859 (Graphic reconstruction)

== See also ==
- Coat of arms of Moldova
- Coat of arms of Romania
- Flag of Moldova
- Flag of Romania

== Sources ==
- Andrieș-Tabac, Silviu (2018). "Despre steagul lui Ştefan cel Mare purtat în ziua de 12 septembrie 1485 la Colomeea în cadrul ceremoniei de depunere a omagiului de vasalitate faţă de regele Poloniei Cazimir IV Jagiełło" [Regarding the flag of Stephen the Great displayed on 12 September 1485 at Colomeea as a part of the homage ceremony to the King of Poland Casimir IV Jagiełło] (PDF). Heraldica Moldaviae. I. Chișinău: 21–74. ISBN 978-9975-87-450-2.
- Bălescu, Valeria (2020). "Stindardul lui Ștefan cel Mare de la Muntele Athos, cel mai vechi steag al Moldovei" [The standard of Stephen the Great from Mount Athos, the oldest flag of Moldavia]. historia.ro.
- Bercu, Igor (2019). Stema Țării Moldovei: cap de bour sau cap de zimbru? [Coat of Arms of Moldavia: aurochs head or wisent head?]. Historia est Magistra Vitae: Valori, paradigme, personalităţi. Chișinău. pp. 84–92. ISBN 978-9975-3331-2-2.
- Bița, Traian (1997). "Când a devenit capul de bour stemă a Moldovei?" [When did the aurochs's head become the coat of arms of Moldavia?]. Arheologia Moldovei. XX. București: Editura Academiei Române: 187–202. doi:10.11588/amold.1997.0.32263.
- Cernovodeanu, Dan (1977). Știința și arta heraldică în România [Heraldic science and art in Romania]. București: Editura Științifică și Enciclopedică.
- Cosovan, Veronica (2018). Domnitori și steme românești [Romanian rulers and coats of arms] (PDF). Chișinău: Biblioteca Națională a Republicii Moldova. ISBN 978-9975-3205-4-2.
- Mischevca, Vlad (2010). "Tricolorul naţional. Introducere în simbolistica vexicologică" [The national tricolor. Introduction to vexicological symbolism] (PDF). Akademos - Revistă de Știință, Inovare, Cultură și Artă. 2 (17). Academia de Științe a Moldovei: 3–14. ISSN 1857-0461.
- Mischevca, Vlad (2012). ""...Şi care-i crima?"" ["... And what's the crime?"]. vladmischevca.blogspot.com.
- Tiron, Tudor-Radu (2012). "Steagurile heraldice ale lui Ştefan cel Mare. Certitudini şi ipoteze în lumina informaţiilor mai vechi sau mai noi" [The Heraldic Flags of Stephen the Great. Certainties and Hypothesis in the Light of Newer and Older Information]. Analele Putnei. VIII (1). Centrul de cercetare şi documentare Ştefan cel Mare: 71–92. ISSN 1841-625X.
- Tiron, Tudor-Radu; Lefter, Lucian-Valeriu (2014). "The Feudal Ceremony of Colomeea/Kołomyja (September 12th 1485). Notes on the Moldavian Heraldry and Vexillology during the Reign of Prince Stephen the Great". Cercetări Istorice (Serie nouă). XXXIII. Iași: 57–78. ISSN 1453-3960.
