= Postage stamps and postal history of Romania =

== 1800s ==
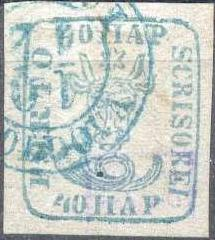
Moldavian Cap de bour, 40 parale, greenish-blue, stamped, 1858

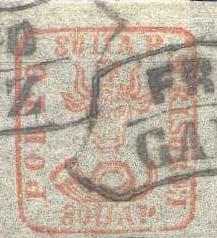
Moldavian Cap de bour, 80 parale, red, stamped (Galatz), 1858

The principality of Moldavia issued stamps immediately upon gaining autonomy in 1858, with the first cap de bour stamps being issued in July 1858. These were produced by hand stamping on laid paper, and are now quite rare. The initial round design was shortly followed by one using a square frame with rounded corners, and using blue or white wove paper. These are somewhat more common.

After the union of Moldavia and Wallachia in 1861, the design was adapted to show the emblems of both principalities side by side, and inscribed "FRANCO SCRISOREI". The first stamps inscribed "POSTA ROMANA" were issued in January 1865; the three values depicted Prince Alexandru Ioan Cuza in profile, facing right.

These did not last long in use, as Cuza was deposed the following year, and new stamps depicted Prince Carol I, also in profile, but facing left, and in a style very similar to contemporary French stamps. The adoption of the leu in 1867 required stamps in new denominations, which appeared in 1868.

In 1869, a new design consisted of the profile as before, but enclosed in an oval frame, a change lasting only until 1872, when the previous round frame once again came into use, with an overall design reminiscent of the contemporaneous stamps of France. They were originally printed in Paris, and then reprinted in Bucharest from 1876, the reprints having a rougher appearance and coarser perforations. New colors and values appeared in 1879.

In 1885, a new definitive series used larger and more readable numeric tablets, and surmounted Carol's profile with a bird. In 1889 the stamp paper was also impressed with a coat of arms, similar to, but not a true watermark. In 1891, Romania issued its first commemorative stamps, a series of five in which the usual profile of the king was framed by an inscription marking 25 years of his reign. The series of 1893 introduced a variety of frames, and the first stamps denominated in lei.

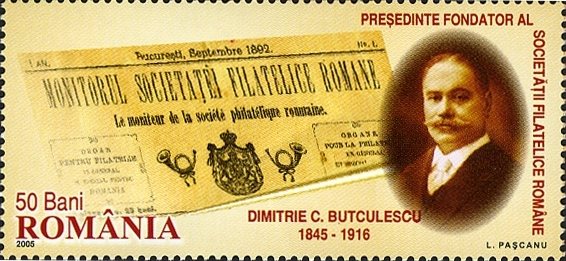
A 2005 Romanian stamp featuring Dimitrie C. Butculescu, the founder of the Romanian Philatelic Society, and an 1892 issue of The Official Gazette of the Romanian Philatelic Society

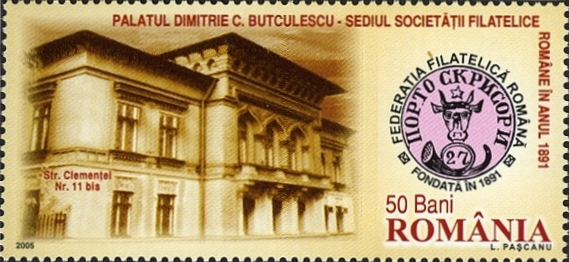
A 2005 Romanian stamp dedicated to the founding of the Romanian Philatelic Society in 1891. It features the house of Butculescu that hosted the society.

In 1891, Dimitrie C. Butculescu founded the Romanian Philatelic Society. He became its first president, running the society from his private house, and published The Official Gazette of the Romanian Philatelic Society.

In 1896, Romanian stamps were overprinted in Turkish currency for use on ships passing between Constanța and Constantinople.

In 1903, the first pictorial designs were issued to note the opening of a new post office in Bucharest, followed by a series of 10 designs in 1906, for the 40th anniversary of Carol's reign.

== Early 1900s ==
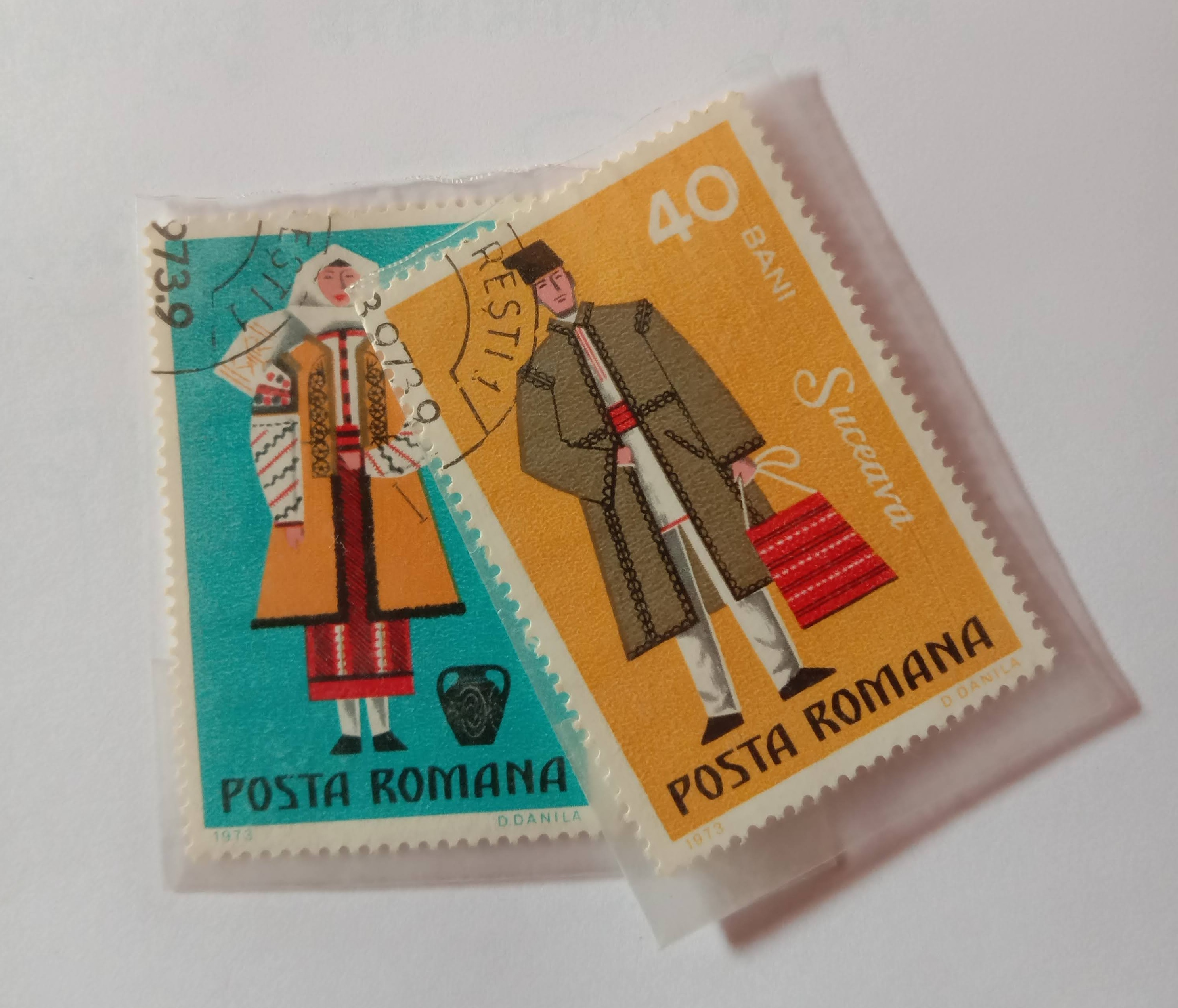
Two postage stamps of Romania from the 1970s, showing the country's costume culture

During World War I, Romanian territory was occupied by Austria, Germany, and Bulgaria, each of which issued stamps for the occupied areas.

== See also ==
- Poșta Română
- Postage stamps and postal history of Moldova
- Postage stamps and postal history of Transnistria
- Zimbrul și Vulturul

== Sources ==
- Stanley Gibbons Ltd: various catalogues
- Encyclopaedia of Postal Authorities
- Rossiter, Stuart & John Flower. The Stamp Atlas. London: Macdonald, 1986. ISBN 0-356-10862-7
