= Phoenix Insurance Company =

Israeli insurance company

Phoenix Insurance Company Ltd

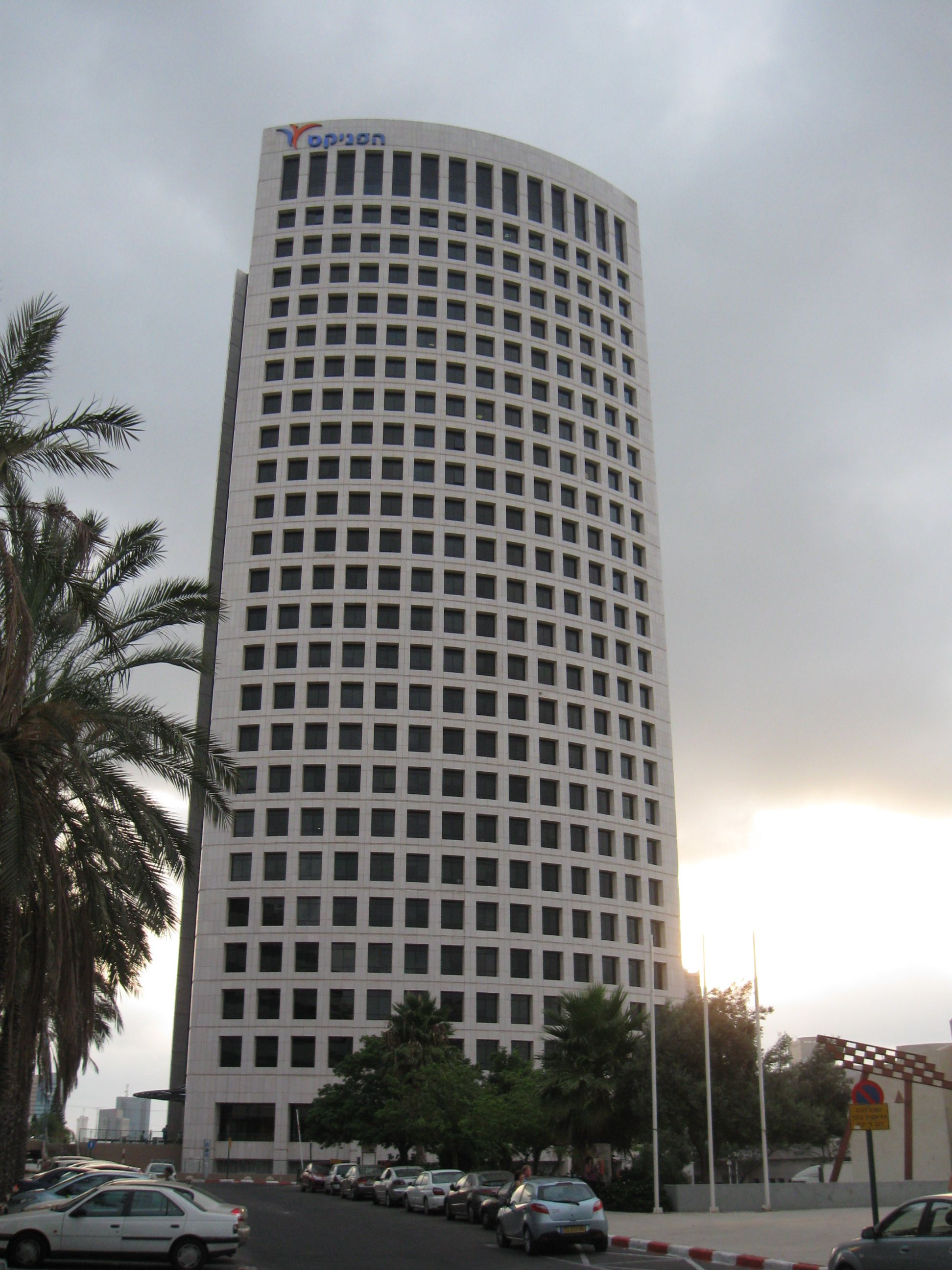
- Native name: הפניקס חברה לביטוח בע"מ
- Type: Subsidiary
- Industry: Insurance; Financial services
- Founded: 1949; 77 years ago
- Founder: David Chachmi
- Headquarters: Givatayim, Israel
- Key people: Binyamin Gabay (Chairman)
- Products: Life insurance; Provident Funds
- Parent: Phoenix Financial
- Website: www.fnx.co.il

Phoenix Insurance Company Ltd. (Hebrew: הפניקס חברה לביטוח בע"מ) is an Israeli insurance company that deals with all spheres of insurance. Phoenix is the largest insurance company in the Israeli insurance industry in terms of market value and asset size as of 2023.

== History ==
The company began with the establishment of "Israeli Insurance Agencies" by David Chachmi, son of Yosef Chachmi, who was the manager of Barclays Bank in the Land of Israel. Chachmi represented English insurance companies in the Land of Israel, including Phoenix. In 1949, he founded the "Israeli Phoenix" company, which at the beginning of the 21st century was sold by Chachmi's children, Yossi and Nitza, to Yaakov Shahar and Israel Kaz.

The company is fully owned by Phoenix Financial Ltd., which controls additional companies in the fields of insurance, finance, and more. Phoenix Finance's securities are traded on the Tel Aviv Stock Exchange on the list of the 35 largest companies in the Israeli economy. The company's management is located in the Rose House in Givatayim.

In the 1980s, the company ran into disputes with its partner in the "Arad" insurance company, which eventually bought out his share in the company and merged it into it.

From 2009 to 2019, Eyal Lapidot served as the company's CEO. In February 2014, a workers' committee was established for the first time at the company, which signed a collective agreement about two years later. In 2019, Lapidot resigned from the position, and Eyal Ben-Simon replaced him.

In June 2015, it was announced that a deal had been signed to sell Phoenix Holdings (as it was then called) from the Delek Group to the Chinese Fosun Corporation for NIS 1.8 billion. In February 2016, the deal was canceled, due to opposition from the Insurance Supervisor at the Ministry of Finance. After several additional acquisition attempts, in November 2019, the sale of the controlling stake in Phoenix Holdings from the Delek Group to Belenus Lux S.a.r.l., held by Centerbridge and Gallatin Capital funds, was completed.

The company has a large collection of art Israeli, created when it was managed by Yosef Chachmi.

On October 30, 2019, the company announced the cessation of marketing of private long-term care insurance.

In 2021, the company was a partner in the establishment of "Bizzy Finance Ltd."

The Phoenix Company is the largest institutional investor in Israel in terms of market capitalization, and manages pension savings worth over NIS 360 billion.

In October 2025, the company acquired, through the "Oren Mizrahi" insurance agency under its control, 86% of the Wobi insurance agency at a value of up to NIS 150 million.
