= Postage stamps and postal history of Moldova =

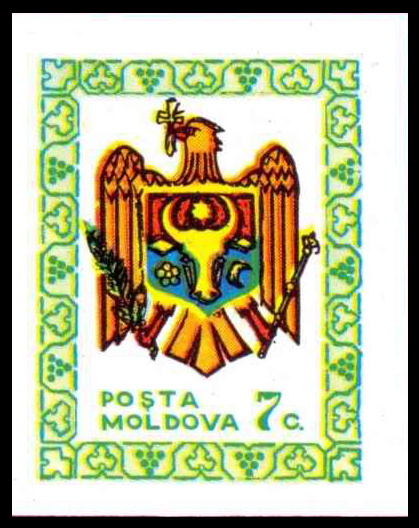
A 1991 stamp of Moldova

This is a survey of the postage stamps and postal history of Moldova.

Moldova, officially the Republic of Moldova is a landlocked country in Eastern Europe, located between Romania to the west and Ukraine to the north, east and south. It declared itself an independent state with the same boundaries as the preceding Moldovan SSR in 1991, as part of the devolution of the Soviet Union. A strip of Moldova's internationally recognized territory on the east bank of the river Nistru has been under the de facto control of the breakaway government of Transnistria since 1990.

== First stamps ==
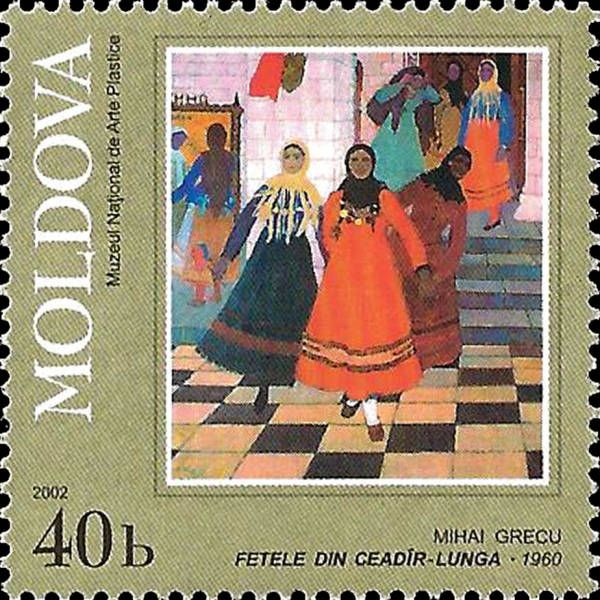
A 2002 stamp of Moldova

The first stamps of independent Moldova were designed by Grigoriy Bronza and issued in 1991.

== See also ==
- Grigoriy Bronza
- Poşta Moldovei
- Postage stamps and postal history of Romania
- Postage stamps and postal history of Russia
- Postage stamps and postal history of Transnistria
- Zimbrul și Vulturul
