= Moldavian Bull's Heads =

First Romanian postage stamps

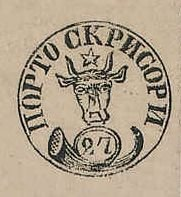
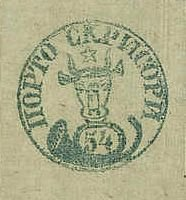
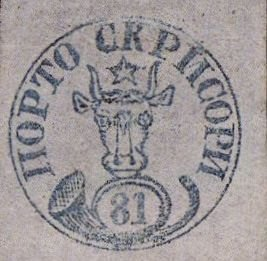
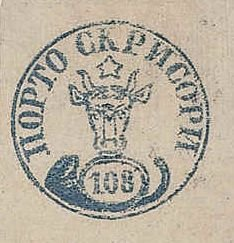
Four values of the first issue, 1858

The Moldavian Bull's Heads (Romanian: cap de bour, lit. "aurochs head") are the first Romanian postage stamps, sold by the Principality of Moldavia from July to October 1858. Released in four values, these stamps are renowned for their rarity. The second and third Romanian issues also feature the head of the aurochs, symbol of Moldavia—the former on its own and the latter, printed after the Union of the Principalities, alongside a representation of Wallachia.

== First issue ==
Following the 1856 Treaty of Paris, the Danubian Principalities of Moldavia and Wallachia took a number of modernizing measures, including postal reform. Their leaders were aware of the appearance of postage stamps, starting in the United Kingdom in 1840. In Moldavia, caimacam Nicolae Vogoride and his council named a postal committee and directorate as well as hiring trained personnel from Austria. The postal headquarters was set up in a 14-room building in Iaşi, and price regulations were issued on June 30 and July 6, 1858. A letter traveling up to eight post offices cost 27 para (57 bani), and one going more than eight cost 54 para (1.14 lei). Short-distance registered letters were 81 para (2 lei) and long-distance ones cost 108 para (2.28 lei). From Iaşi, one could send a regular letter for 27 para to Bacău, Botoşani, Dorohoi, Fălticeni, Huşi, Mihăileni, Piatra Neamţ, Roman, Târgu Ocna, Târgu Neamţ and Vaslui. (Mihăileni was farther than eight post offices, but received a lower rate since it was a border crossing point.) The higher rate was charged when sending to Adjud, Bârlad, Bolgrad, Cahul, Focşani, Galaţi, Ismail and Tecuci. Letters bearing the stamps could only circulate within Moldavia. The charges were valid until October 31, 1858, with a new stamp series and a single charge introduced the following day.

Starting on July 1, 1858, letters without stamps were placed in mailboxes placed in public squares and at the postal headquarters in Iaşi, while in other towns such letters were handed over at the post office. Payment would then be made by the recipient. Although the rates went into effect on July 1, it seems the stamps were not placed into circulation until July 15. Their printing was approved May 26, and four steel dies costing 389 lei had been produced by July 1, the engraver unknown. The stamp sheets were printed one by one with the aid of a manual press; in all, 24,064 stamps were printed. Unlike many stamps of the period, which featured the ruling head of state, Moldavia's had the ancient coat of arms with the head of an aurochs. There is a five-pointed star between the horns. The aurochs' lower lip rests on a post horn, within the inner tube of which is the stamp's value in Arabic numerals. The horn and head are enclosed in a circle. Around this circle, in the interior above the head, are the Romanian Cyrillic letters ПОРТО СКРИСОРИ (PORTO SCRISORI; "letters to be paid for by the recipient"). The use of the word PORTO is a mistake; FRANCO denotes letters where the postage has been paid by the sender, as was the case for letters using these stamps.

Aside from the economic advantage derived from simplifying communications, the stamps and the symbol they used were a political statement against the Ottoman Empire that still exercised suzerainty over the principality. The Ottomans themselves would not issue a stamp until 1863. Indeed, they are the first stamps from Southeast Europe, with Greece issuing its first in 1861, Serbia in 1866 and Bulgaria in 1879. Earlier attempts to introduce a national coin or seal had been denied by Turkey, but the stamp, Moldavia's first exercise of autonomous statehood, was allowed because the relevant imperial authorities there were not yet familiar with the notion.

The paper used to print the stamps came from Bath, Somerset, imported by an Iaşi merchant and bought by the Finance Ministry. (According to another variant, the project was undertaken in haste, and leaves of paper were bought from an Iaşi bookstore.) Each sheet had 32 stamps, with four rows of eight, and the middle rows included eight tête-bêche pairs. The 27 para were done in black ink; the rest in blue. The sheets were tinted rose (27 para), greenish (54 para), bluish (81 para) and light rose (108 para). The paper was horizontally lined, except for the 81 para, which was ordinary paper. The sheets were gummed manually with a brush using gum arabic. The stamps were imperforate, cut with scissors at the post office. Because of this, individual stamps have significant size differences between them. Also, due to the manual printing, the rows of stamps were not properly aligned on the sheets.

Stamps were cancelled with a double circle featuring the name of the post office above and the word Moldova below, in capital letters. In the middle, in fractional form, were the date and month in Arabic numerals. The rubber stamps were ordered from Vienna.

The first 187 sheets of 32 (5,984 stamps) were sent from the press to the treasury on July 11, 1858. These were sent to the post office headquarters the following day, receipt confirmed on July 14. Headquarters decided not to send the stamps to other post offices until the full stock was received. The remaining 18,080 stamps had arrived by July 21, when the first stamps were sent to the main post office in Iaşi. In August, stamps were sent to Bacău, Bârlad, Botoşani, Dorohoi, Fălticeni, Focşani, Galaţi, Roman, Tecuci, Târgu Neamţ, Vaslui and Mihăileni. The earliest letters featuring the stamps date to July 22; the latest, to October 31.

== Second and third issues ==
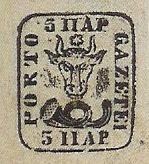
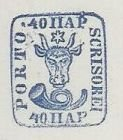
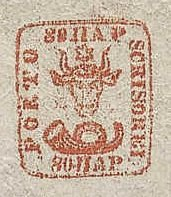
Three values of the second issue
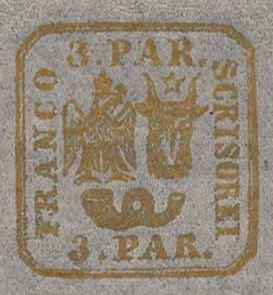
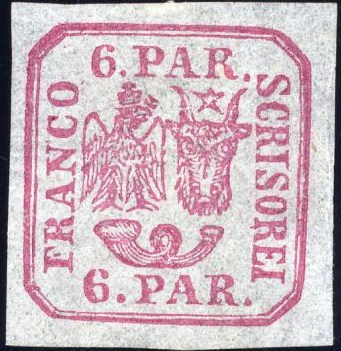
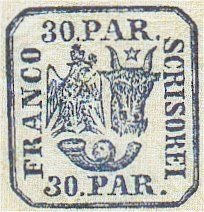
Three values of the third issue

The second series had three stamps: 5 para, 40 para (1 leu) and 80 para (2 lei). Regular letters cost 40 para, registered mail 80 para, simple newspapers 5 para and double newspapers 10 para. On these stamps, the head and horn were surrounded by a rectangle with rounded corners, and the inscription (PORTO GAZETEI for the 5 para and PORTO SCRISOREI for the 40 and 80 para) was in Latin characters, while "parale" was in Cyrillic. Printing figures are as follows:

Value	27 Oct. 1858	4 Nov. 1858	14 Nov. 1858	1859	1860	1861	Total
5 para	960	2,048	4,000	4,032	8,000	4,000	23,040
40 para	7,040	4,960	0	33,032	37,000	24,000	106,032
80 para	2,816	2,208	0	16,048	23,000	16,000	60,072
Total	10,816	9,216	4,000	53,112	68,000	44,000	189,144

These stamps circulated in Moldavia, and very rarely in Wallachia after the Union of the Principalities on January 24, 1859. They were withdrawn on May 1, 1862, although four stamps were cancelled on May 3 in Botoşani, official use having been extended on request until May 5.

The third series of Romanian stamps, issued under the auspices of the United Principalities, was valid between May 1, 1862 and December 31, 1864. It featured the aurochs' head as well as the Wallachian vulture, replaced PORTO with FRANCO, and used only Latin letters. It appeared in values of 3, 6 and 30 para, in two series (1862 and 1864). Printed in Bucharest, a delay meant the stamps were not placed in circulation until May 26. The second series of the third issue were sold from September 13, 1864 until the end of the year.

== Scarcity and legacy ==
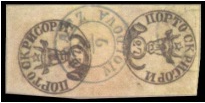
The only known tete-beche pair of the first issue, once owned by Carol II of Romania, now presumed to be lost

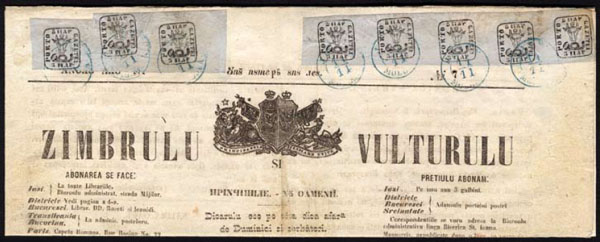
The Zimbrul și Vulturul newspaper franked by eight 5-parale stamps of the second issue

Printing figures for the first issue are as follows: 6,016 of the 27 para; 10,016 of the 54 para; 2,016 of the 81 para and 6,016 of the 108 para. By the end of October, when they were withdrawn, 11,756 of 24,064 had been sold. The remaining 12,308 stamps were deposited at the headquarters. Later, following Moldavia's union with Wallachia and the creation of a single postal service, they were moved to the old central post office on Strada Doamnei in Bucharest (now the site of the Stock Market Palace). The stock was destroyed in a devastating fire in 1874. A 1994 study (giving slightly different figures for the number of stamps sold and withdrawn) of the first issue stamps still extant found the following:

Value	Printed	Sold	Withdrawn	In collections	Used	Unused
27 para	6,016	3,691	2,325	176	160	16
54 para	10,016	4,772	5,244	262	238	24
81 para	2,016	709	1,307	62	37	25
108 para	6,016	2,574	3,442	187	169	18
total	24,064	11,746	12,318	687	592	95

By 1864, the collection of British philatelist Edward Loines Pemberton featured Bull's Heads, already famous for their scarcity. Philipp von Ferrary owned thirteen of them at one point. The set included a 27-para tête-bêche pair later owned by Arthur Hind and purchased by King Carol II of Romania in 1935 for £1000. The unique pair subsequently vanished. An early Romanian collector was Costică Câncea of Craiova; in 1882, a Turnu Măgurele philatelist offered 5-10 lei each for his first and second-series Bull's Heads. Meanwhile, in 1881, two brothers from Iași offered a Bucharest postal official 125 gold francs for an 81-para used stamp, and in 1882, a Botoșani collector offered a second-issue 40-para stamp to a Bucharest counterpart. In 1879, Dimitrie C. Sturdza-Scheianu became the first Romanian to donate his collection to the state (more precisely, to the Romanian Academy); his holdings included Bull's Heads.

A number of noted Romanian collectors are associated with the Bull's Heads. George Matheescu-Sinaia obtained several Bull's Heads by scouring the attics of people during his travels. In 1938, he paid a large sum for a sheet of essays thought to be unique. It turned out that Baron Job Wilhelm von Witzleben also owned a sheet, and that these were forgeries baked in an oven to appear older. The woman who sold them was acquitted of any wrongdoing, as she had obtained them from a convicted murderer who reportedly escaped from prison using the proceeds. In 1933, a German philatelist had loaned him an 80-para second-issue stamp, asking 150,000 lei. Matheescu offered 75,000; the owner refused, asking for the stamp to be returned. When the former failed to do so, the owner wrote to King Carol to intervene and sued; ultimately, in 1939, a court ordered Matheescu to pay the full amount, plus a fine of 5000 lei.

Eduardo Cohen owned nineteen Bull's Heads. In 1978, Ludovic Dengel donated his collections to the state; these included both the first and the second issues. For many years, Constantin Milu owned the only Romanian collection that took part in foreign exhibitions and included copies of the Bull's Head. Sorin Pantiș owned many copies of the first two issues before selling his collection in 2007. Kiriac Dragomir and Corneliu Spineanu are among the authors of specialist studies, the latter focusing on the second issue. International collectors include William Beilby Avery, who owned at least 21 first issues; Ferrary, who by the time his collection was sold posthumously between 1921 and 1925, had amassed 32; King Farouk of Egypt, who owned first-issue philatelic covers; René Berlingin, who focused on the first issue, including the tête-bêche at one point; and Lars Amundsen, who owned eight exemplars. Edmond Léon of Belgium owned copies of both issues, while Roberto Tomasini had at least 22 first issues, as well as the Zimbrul și Vulturul newspaper. The Spaniard Isidro Payá Noguera owned first issues. Job Witzleben was a German banker who arrived in Romania as early as 1917, living in Bucharest until his internment in 1944, and amassing a vast collection. By 1949, this had fallen into the hands of a SovRom. Its whereabouts are unknown, although in 2010, a German observer suggested it is held at the A.S. Popov Central Museum of Communications in Saint Petersburg. According to a 1945 inventory, his collection included a considerable number of Bull's Heads, including covers. Fritz Heimbuchler is considered one of the world’s greatest specialists on the Bull's Head issues. He owned 45 copies of the first issue before his collection was sold in 2010.

King Carol II was one of the last philatelists who by 1940 owned a virtually complete collection of every stamp issued anywhere in the world. His lavish holdings of Romanian stamps included the choicest Bull's Heads in Matheescu-Sinaia’s collection. Among these were each value in mint condition. There are two versions of how he acquired these. The first, credited by Heimbuchler, holds that Matheescu, by then mayor of Sinaia, asked the king for help in finding a husband for his daughter. The king agreed, finding an army major for the role, but asked for the stamps in exchange. The second, proposed by Silviu Dragomir, suggests that the mayor borrowed money from the king during the Great Depression and repaid the debt with the stamps. Moreover, the king’s wealth attracted numerous offers from foreign dealers; for example, in 1937, he purchased an 81-para stamp from Berlingin after Witzleben vouched for its authenticity. He presented his collection in London in May 1950, meeting with acclaim. The subsequent fate of his Romanian stamps is unknown, and there is no record of where his Bull's Heads ended up.

A 2009 investigation of the Romanian National Philatelic Museum's holdings revealed that 215 stamps of the first series and 660 of the second and third had been replaced by suspected forgeries. Heimbuchler certified they were forged, although the museum responded that he had only analyzed three stamps directly, with the rest of his decision based on scans, and that the authenticity remains uncertain. Their total value was variously estimated at €3.15 million or €60 million.

An authentic Bull's Head stamp was worth between €5,000 and €100,000 by 2010. Just two copies of the 81 para survive in mint never-hinged, original gum condition, estimated at €70,000 to €100,000. In 2007, a November 11, 1858 edition of Zimbrul şi Vulturul featuring eight 5-para stamps from the second series became the most expensive newspaper copy ever sold at auction, going for €750,000.

The stamps were reprinted several times, and also forged in Romania and abroad. Captain Costică Moroiu was one of these forgers. In 1881, the same year he founded the Romanian Philatelic Society, he created 1858-design stamps with values of 15, 45, 90 and 135 para. In 1883, stationed at Mangalia, he sold stamps with his own design at a brisk pace, evading punishment. In 1889, prosecutors entered the press of Universul newspaper, where they found dies for and thousands of copies of Bull's Head stamps. Arrested and sent to Văcărești Prison, he attempted suicide. Moroiu was released for lack of evidence, having argued that all his customers knew the stamps were forgeries.

The stamps have been admired at various expositions, including at what is now Sala Dalles in 1932 for their 75th anniversary, and at the Postal Palace in 1958 for their centenary. The original dies survive and are on display at the philatelic museum. Celebrations of the centenary were approved at the highest echelons of the Romanian Workers' Party, in a meeting attended by Gheorghe Gheorghiu-Dej, Leonte Răutu and Emil Bodnăraș, among others.

Vasile Voiculescu's 1947 short story Capul de zimbru and Lucian Pintilie's 2006 film Tertium non datur both feature the Bull's Head stamp as one of their themes.

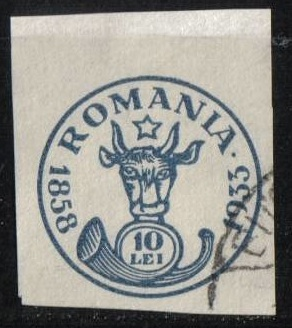
1932 stamp replicating the first issue (75th anniversary)

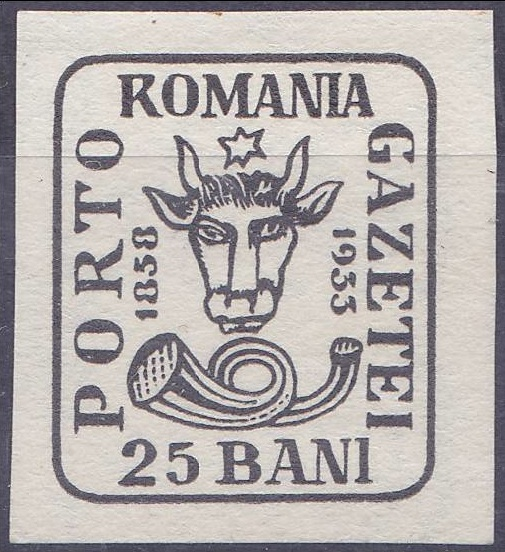
1932 stamp replicating the second issue

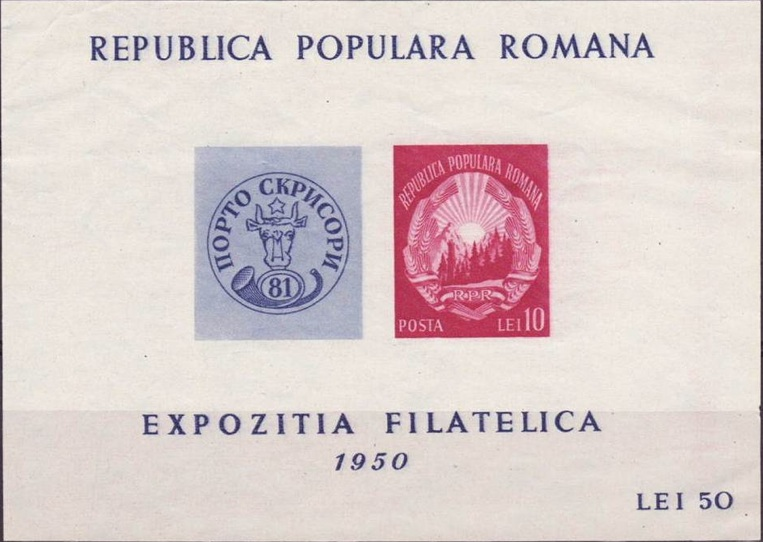
1950 miniature sheet for a philatelic exposition, replicating the first issue

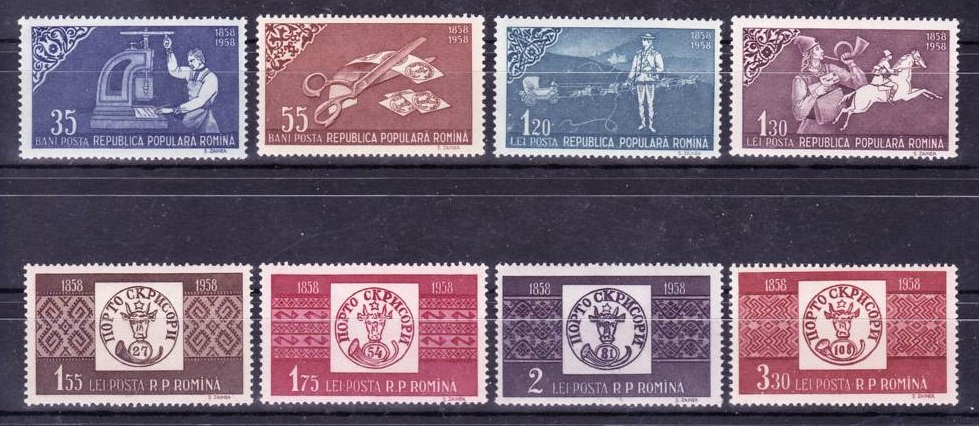
1958 stamp series marking the centennial of the first issue

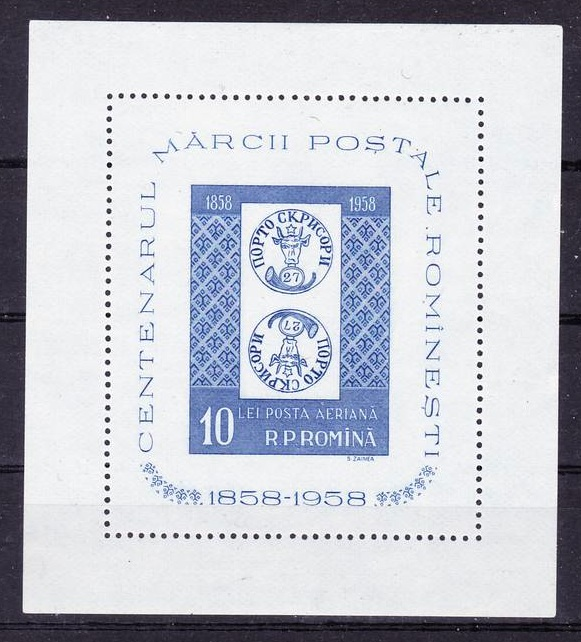
1958 miniature sheet with a first issue tête-bêche pair

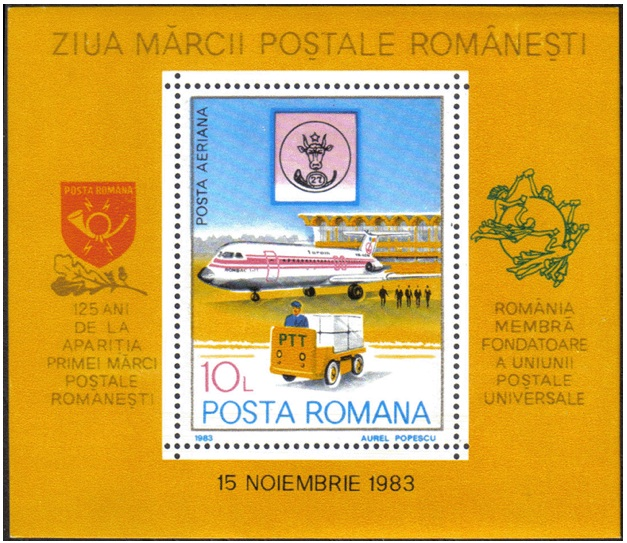
1983 miniature sheet marking the 125th anniversary of the first issue

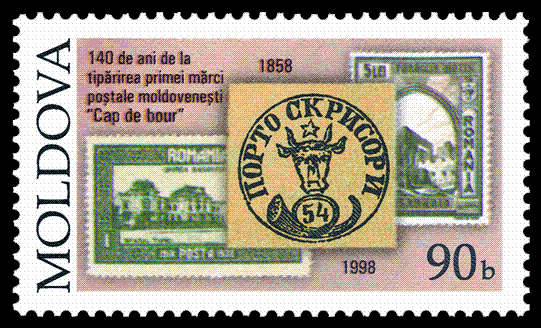
1998 Moldovan stamp marking the 140th anniversary of the first issue

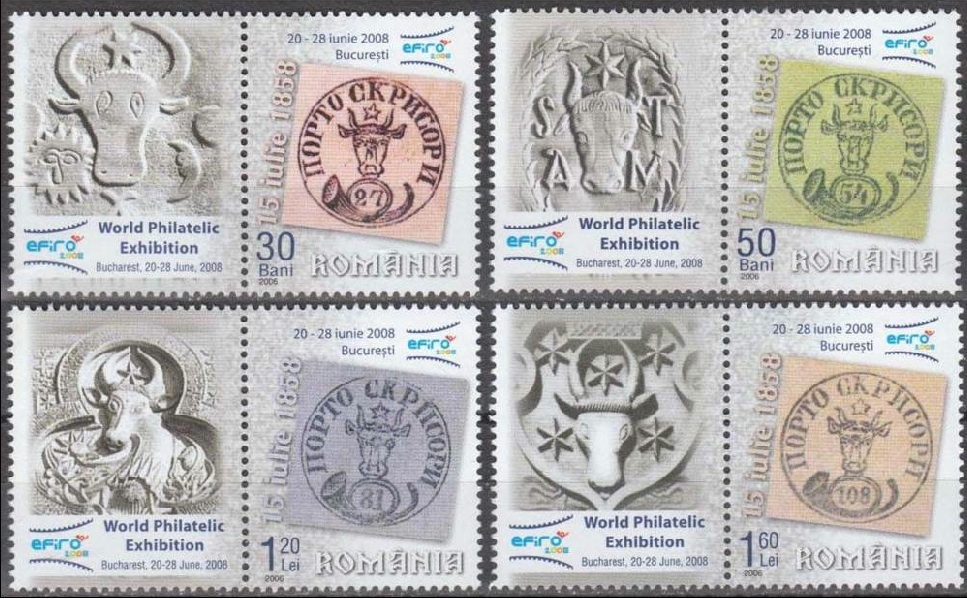
2006 stamp series marking the 150th anniversary of the first issue

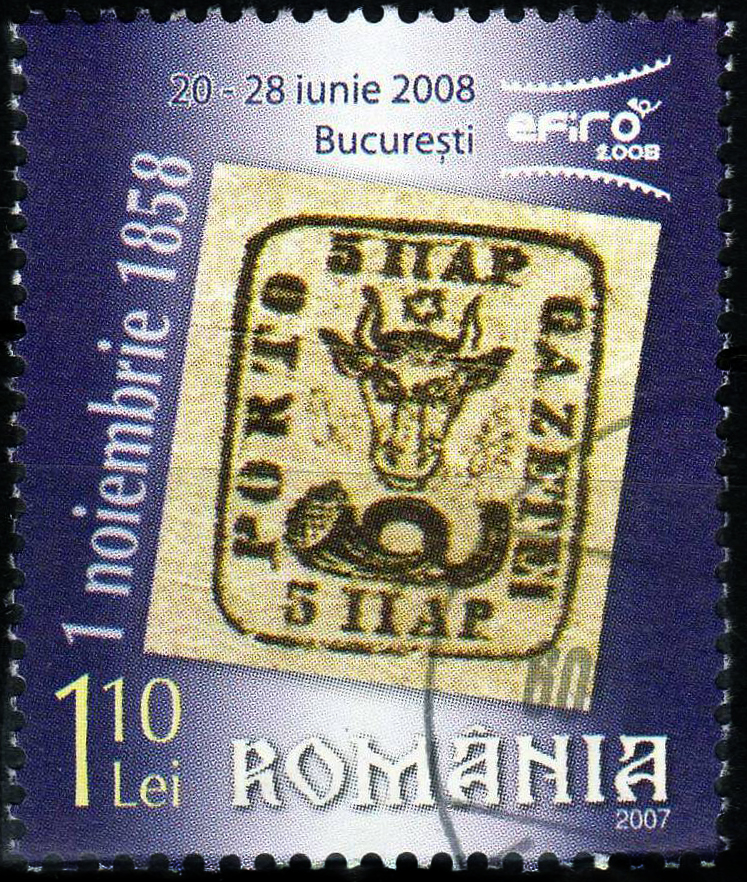
2007 stamp marking the 150th anniversary of the second issue

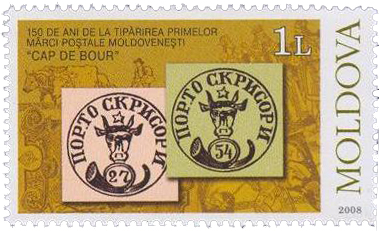
2008 Moldovan stamp marking the 150th anniversary of the first issue

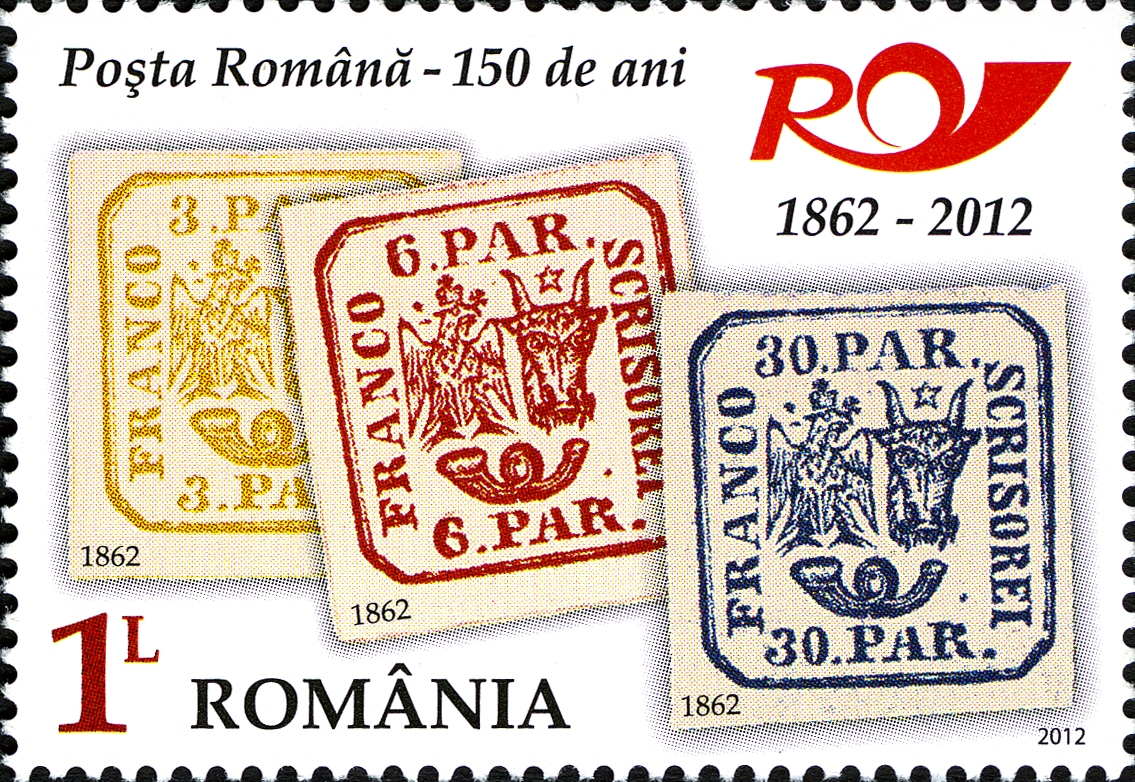
2012 stamp marking the 150th anniversary of Poșta Română and of the third issue

== References and sources ==
Notes

Sources

- (in Romanian) Ştefan Nicolau, Poşta şi filateliştii botoşăneni, Editura Axa, Botoşani, 2007. ISBN 978-973-660-265-8
- Cristian Andrei Scăiceanu, Istoria mișcării filatelice din România, Editura Oscar Print, Bucharest, 2011. ISBN 978-973-668-272-8
