= Poșta Moldovei =

Postal service in Moldova

Post of Moldova

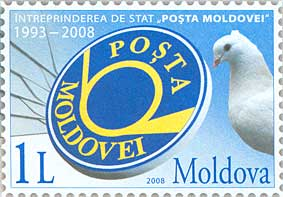
- Moldovan stamp with the Poșta Moldovei logo commemorating its 15th anniversary
- Type: State-owned enterprise
- Industry: Postal service
- Founded: April 1993
- Founder: Ministry of Informational Technologies and Communication
- Headquarters: Chișinău
- Area served: Moldova
- Revenue: 566,979,323 Moldovan leu (2024)
- Operating income: 58,783,309 Moldovan leu (2024)
- Net income: 52,874,803 Moldovan leu (2024)
- Total assets: 638,540,491 Moldovan leu (2024)
- Number of employees: 3,210 (2024)
- Website: www.posta.md

Poșta Moldovei (English: Post of Moldova) is the company responsible for postal service in Moldova. It was founded in April 1993.

== History ==
The company was founded on 1 April 1993, as a result of the division of the postal communications sector from that of telecommunications. They were awarded the status of national operator in 1995, and thus given the sole rights to operate a postal system in Moldova. Since June 2005, the Poșta Moldovei is under the direction of the Ministry of Information Technologies and Communications. They operate over 1100 post office branches in the country, and process approximately 40 million parcels and letters per year. They employ around 6000 people. The company is currently managed by Violeta Cojocaru.

The first issue of postage stamps in the country was launched on 23 June 1991, with the series "The first anniversary of the proclamation of the sovereignty of the Republic of Moldova". This was a set of three stamps, each featuring the flag and the coat of arms of Moldova. On the 25th anniversary of the issue of the first stamps, 23 June 2016, a special edition set of stamps was released. On 27 August 2016, the country also celebrated 25 years of sovereignty, and released another set of stamps, showing the flag of Moldova to commemorate this.

Since January 2007, Poșta Moldovei has been a member of the Telematics Cooperative. The Republic of Moldova has been a member of the Universal Postal Union since 1992. Following this, Poșta Moldovei joined PostEurop on 1 January 1997.

== See also ==
- Postage stamps and postal history of Moldova

== Bibliography ==
- Dinu Poștarenco. Poșta Moldovei. File de istorie. Chişinău 2000. Editura Civitas. ISBN 9975-936-59-8
