= Zimbrul și Vulturul =

19th-century Romanian newspaper

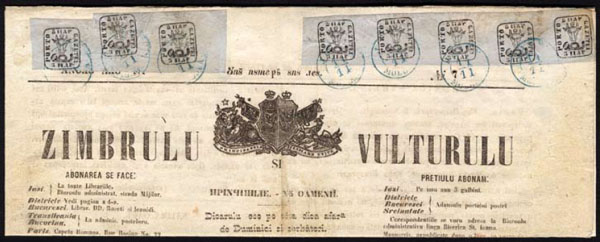
- Zimbrulu si Vulturulu
- Type: Newspaper
- Founded: 3 July 1850 (Zimbrul); 1 November 1858 (Zimbrul și Vulturul)
- Political alignment: Unionist
- Language: Romanian
- Relaunched: 2 January 1859 (Steaua Dunării, Zimbrul și Vulturul)
- City: Iași
- Country: Moldavia

Zimbrul şi Vulturul ("The Wisent and the Eagle") was a 19th-century Romanian newspaper, published in the city of Iași (Iassy), capital of the Principality of Moldavia, and having readership in other parts of what was to become the Kingdom of Romania.

A surviving copy of the paper, dated November 11, 1858, was placed for auction December 3, 2006 through the David Feldman S.A. auction house of Geneva. Several parties expressed interest in purchasing the copy, including the Romanian Ministry of Culture and Religious Affairs. The copy sold for €700,000 (US$927,000 in 2006) to London-based Israeli businessman Joseph Hackmey (יוסי חכמי), a collector of Romanian stamps and memorabilia. Including fees and commissions, the total price was €829,500 (US$1.1 million in 2006), the highest ever paid for a copy of a newspaper.

Chahami told a Yediot Aharonot correspondent that this copy of the newspaper bears eight rare Romanian stamps - the famous Cap de bour ("The Head of Aurochs") IASSY MOLDOVA - issued by Moldavia in that same year (1858) and used as postage for sending the newspaper to a subscriber in the city of Galaţi. "The combination of a rare newspaper and rare stamps have made this a unique item, well worth the price I paid for it" said Hackmey.

== See also ==
- Postage stamps and postal history of Moldova
- Postage stamps and postal history of Romania
