= Grigoriy Bronza =

Soviet painter (1927-2010)

Grigoriy Zakharovich Bronza Григо́рий Заха́рович Бро́нза
- Born: 30 April 1927; Vradiivka, Ukrainian Soviet Socialist Republic, USSR
- Died: 30 January 2010 (aged 82); Tiraspol, Transnistria
- Known for: graphics, sculpture, painting
- Notable work: Postage stamps of Moldova and Transnistria

Grigoriy Zakharovich Bronza (Russian: Григо́рий Заха́рович Бро́нза; 30 April 1927 – 30 January 2010) was a prominent artist of Transnistria (Pridnestrovian Moldavian Republic). He was an art restorer and an honorary member of the Transnistria Union of Artists. Bronza was a designer of postage stamps of Transnistria and Moldova. He also helped create a number of museums in the former Soviet Union.

== World War II ==
During World War II, Grigoriy Bronza served in the Red Army and was awarded the following Soviet military decorations:

- Order of the Patriotic War,
- Medal for Battle Merit,
- Medal "For the Victory over Germany in the Great Patriotic War 1941–1945",
- Medal "For the Victory over Japan".

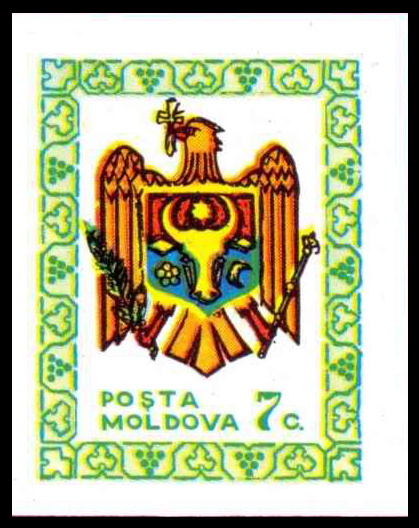
The first stamp of Moldova, 1991. Designed by Grigoriy Bronza

== Postage stamps ==
Bronza is the author of the first stamps of Moldova issued in June 1991. He designed the first stamps of the Pridnestrovian Moldavian Republic issued in December 1993. Bronza designed the third definitive stamp issue of Transnistria (1997). He also created a series of stamps for the 5th anniversary of the events in Bendery (1997), a series of stamps "Historical and modern coats of arms of cities of Transnistria" (1999), the 200th anniversary of Alexander Pushkin issue (1999), etc.

== See also ==
- Postage stamps and postal history of Moldova
- Postage stamps and postal history of Transnistria
