= Phoenix Financial =

Israeli financial services company

Phoenix Financial Ltd.
- Type: Public
- Traded as: TASE: PHOE
- Headquarters: Tel Aviv, Israel
- Key people: Eyal Ben Simon (CEO)
- AUM: >$100 billion (September 2026)

Phoenix Financial is an Israeli financial services and insurance company based in Tel Aviv. Phoenix is Israel's largest asset management, holding over $100 billion in assets under management (AUM) as of September 2026. Eyal Ben Simon is the CEO of Phoenix.

== Operations ==
Phoenix Financial has invested $456 million into arms manufacturers that provide equipment to the Israeli military. These holdings include:

Phoenix Financial Investment in Arms Manufacturers
Company	Industry	Investment
Elbit Systems	Munitions and electronics	$265.1 million
Reshef Technologies	Munitions and electronics	$40.2 million
Next Vision	Drones, cameras and optics	$68.3 million
RP Optical Lab	Drones, cameras and optics	$906 thousand
Beit Shemesh Engines	Aircraft and engines	$55.8 million
Boeing	Aircraft and engines	$4.1 million
Ashot Ashkelon	Tanks and bulldozers	$18.6 million
Caterpillar	Tanks and bulldozers	$2.6 million
Israel Shipyards Ltd	Warships	$525 thousands

Phoenix holds $4.5 billion of shares across 12 companies listed by the Office of the United Nations High Commissioner for Human Rights (OHCHR) for their links to Israeli settlements.

Phoenix Financial owns nearly 10% of the corporate bonds issued to Brightline, the higher speed rail project in Florida.

== History ==
=== Jared Kushner investment ===
In October 2026, CNN published a report into Jared Kushner, US President Donald Trump's son-in-law, and his private equity firm Affinity Partners' relationship with Phoenix Financial. Prior to Trump's second inauguration in 2025, Affinity doubled its investment in Phoenix, with Kushner describing Phoenix as Affinity’s "best investment."

The report cited ethics concerns about Kushner's role as an unofficial White House representative to the Middle East, including his negotiations on the Gaza ceasefire and Board of Peace, and his role as an investor in a company that invests in Israeli arms manufacturers. Cynthia Brown, chief ethics counsel for Citizens for Responsibility and Ethics in Washington, said "There are always people who profit from war or government policies. The difference is that the people profiting should not be the people making the decisions to make that policy. And that is what is happening here."

In June 2026, Affinity announced plans to sell 2.5% of Phoenix shares worth NIS 1.05 billion to international in a transaction led by investment bank Jefferies. Prior to the sale in July, Affinity was the largest shareholder in Phoenix, holding a 9.9% stake prior to the transaction and 7.4% after, worth over $1 billion.

==== Reaction ====
On October 2, 2026, Kushner criticized CNN's report in an X post, characterizing it as "deeply misleading story and headline" for suggesting his "diplomatic work in the Middle East somehow benefited investments in Israeli defense companies".
