= Fritz Heimbuchler =

German stamp enthusiast

Fritz Heimbuchler FRPSL is a German philatelist who was appointed to the Roll of Distinguished Philatelists in 2001. He specialises in the philately of Romania and his collections have won the Grand Prix d'Honneur at SOFIA 79 and the Grand Prix International at ISTANBUL 96. He is a fellow of the Royal Philatelic Society London.

== Selected publications ==
- Romania - the Bull's Heads of Moldavia 1852-1862
