= Postage stamps and postal history of Transnistria =

This is a survey of the postage stamps and postal history of Transnistria, an unrecognized breakaway territory of Moldova and the de facto independent Pridnestrovian Moldavian Republic. Domestic postal services within the region are currently administered by Post of Transnistria.

== Before independence ==
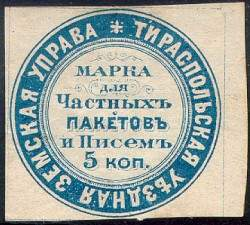
First Tiraspol Zemstvo stamp, 5 kopecks, 1873

=== Tiraspol Zemstvo stamps ===
In the Russian Empire, Tiraspol was an administrative centre of the Tiraspol Uyezd located in the Kherson Governorate. On January 1, 1873, the Tiraspol Zemstvo began running the official local postal service. Two Zemstvo stamps were issued for this purpose, in 1873 and 1879, that were cancelled with a pen. Additionally, free, non-denominated official labels were printed in 1875 but they were not postage stamps.

=== Romanian occupation ===
During World War II, the territory was occupied by the Romanian military forces, and the Transnistrian Government was established. Romania issued special postage stamps for Transnistria in 1941 and 1943, and semi-postals in 1942.

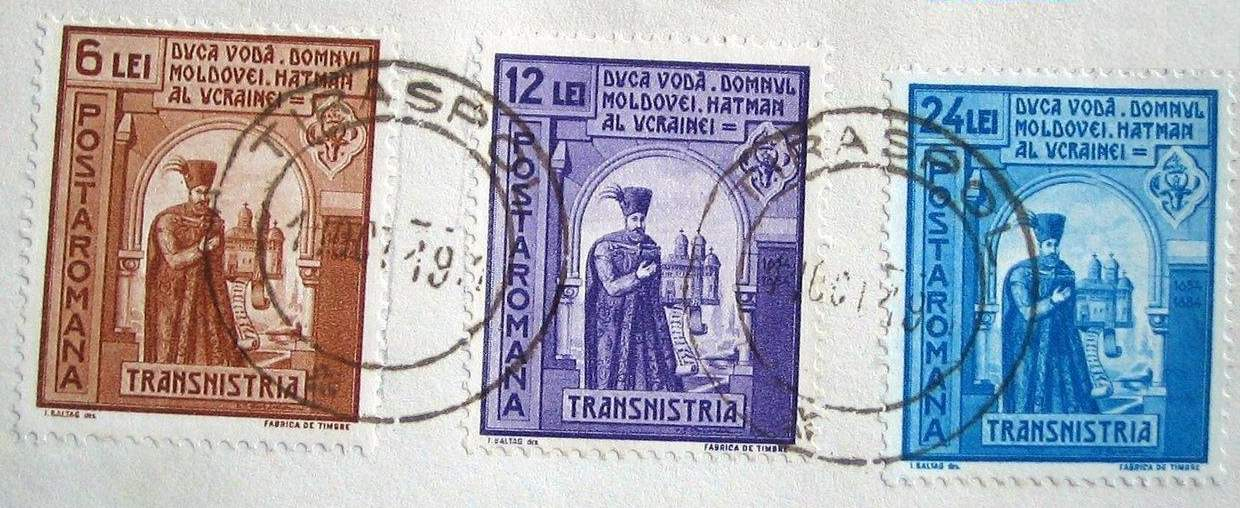
Postage stamps of Romania for Transnistria, 1941, with a Tiraspol postmark

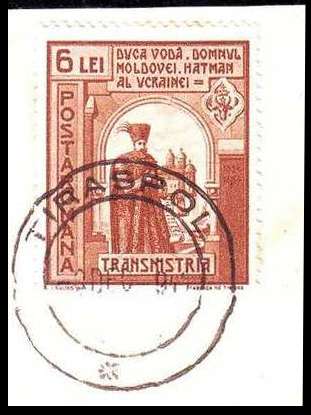
A Romanian stamp for Transnistria on piece and postmarked Tiraspol 1941

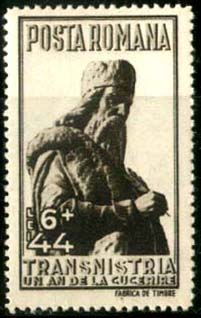
A semi-postal of Romania for Transnistria, 1942

== Tiraspol provisional stamps ==
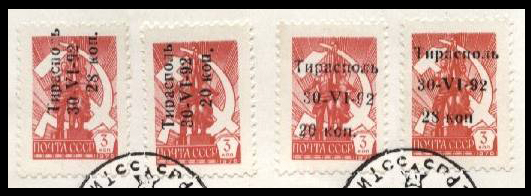
Tiraspol provisional stamps issued in 1992 by overprinting two stamps of the Soviet Union

Transnistria declared its independence from Moldova on September 2, 1990, and in June 1992, the postal authorities in Tiraspol, the capital and administrative centre of the Pridnestrovian Moldavian Republic, overprinted sheets of two definitive stamps of the former Soviet Union. The overprints read 'Тирасполь / 30-VI-92' (Tiraspol / 30-June-92) and two new values, '20 коп.' (20 kopecks) and '28 коп.' (28 kopecks). These provisionals were only in use from July 3 to July 21, 1992, and were then confiscated and destroyed by Moldavian authorities in Kishinev (now Chișinău).

== First PMR stamps ==
On November 18, 1993, the Presidium of the Supreme Soviet (Council) of the Pridnestrovian Moldavian Republic made decision on issuing the first stamps. The first Transnistria stamp was designed by Grigoriy Bronza and appeared on December 31, 1993. Since then it has typically issued between 3 and 5 different series of stamps per year. The region's name is given only in Cyrillic, as 'ПОЧТА ПМР' (POST OF PMR, with PMR standing for Pridnestrovian Moldavian Republic).

=== Validity ===
The postage stamps of Transnistria are not recognised outside of the country and are valid only for domestic service within Transnistria. International mail and mail to the rest of Moldova requires Moldovan postage stamps.

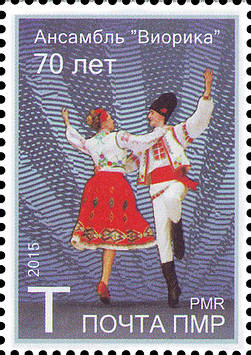
Postage stamps of Pridnestrovian Moldavian Republic, 2015

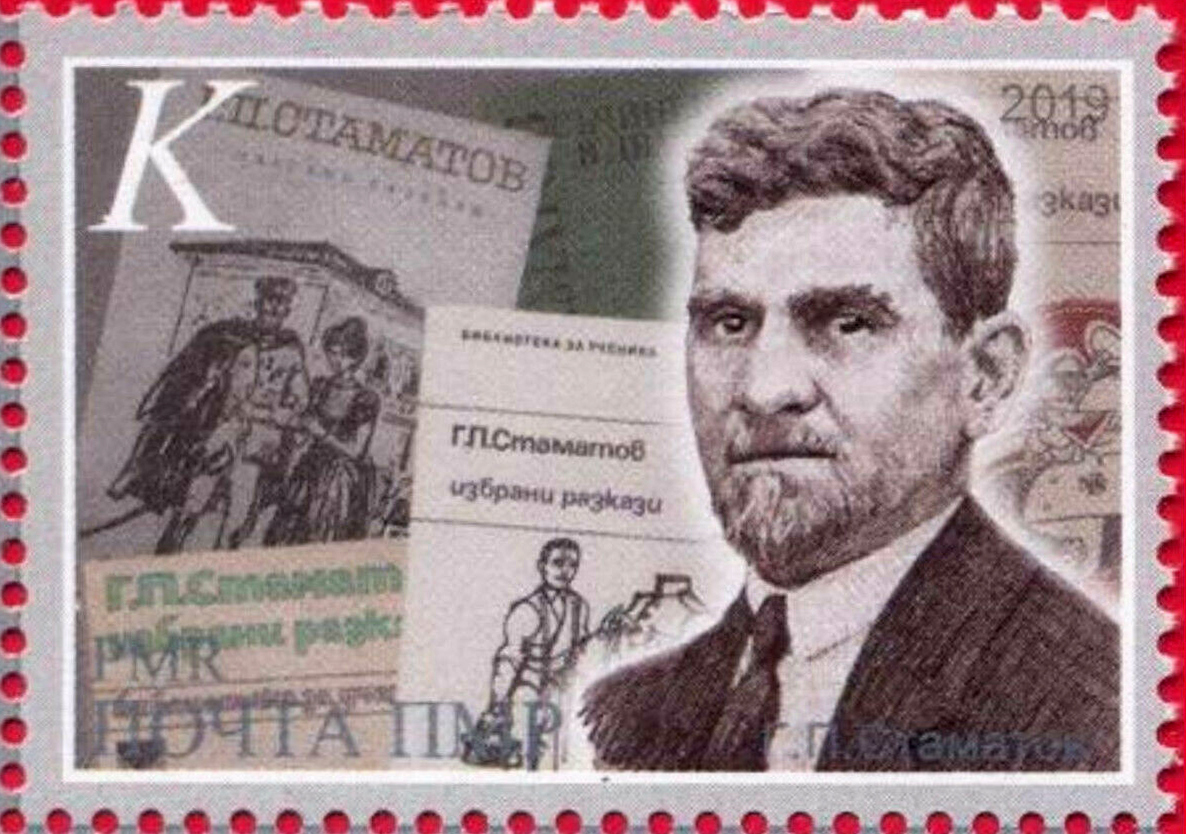
Postage stamps of Pridnestrovian Moldavian Republic, 2019

== Bogus PMR stamps ==
A 1976 stamp of the Soviet Union with a false Transnistrian overprint

Bogus stamp issues have been a problem in the region for several years, with private persons overprinting stamps of the Soviet Union or printing labels resembling Transnistrian stamps, and selling them to unsuspecting collectors. The bogus stamps usually give the region's name in Cyrillic, as 'ПМР' , although sometimes the Latin letters 'PMR' are seen instead. There is no consistent practice, with some stamps only inscribed in Cyrillic and others only in Latin.

== See also ==
- Grigoriy Bronza
- Postage stamps and postal history of Moldova
