= Jacques Legrand (philatelist) =

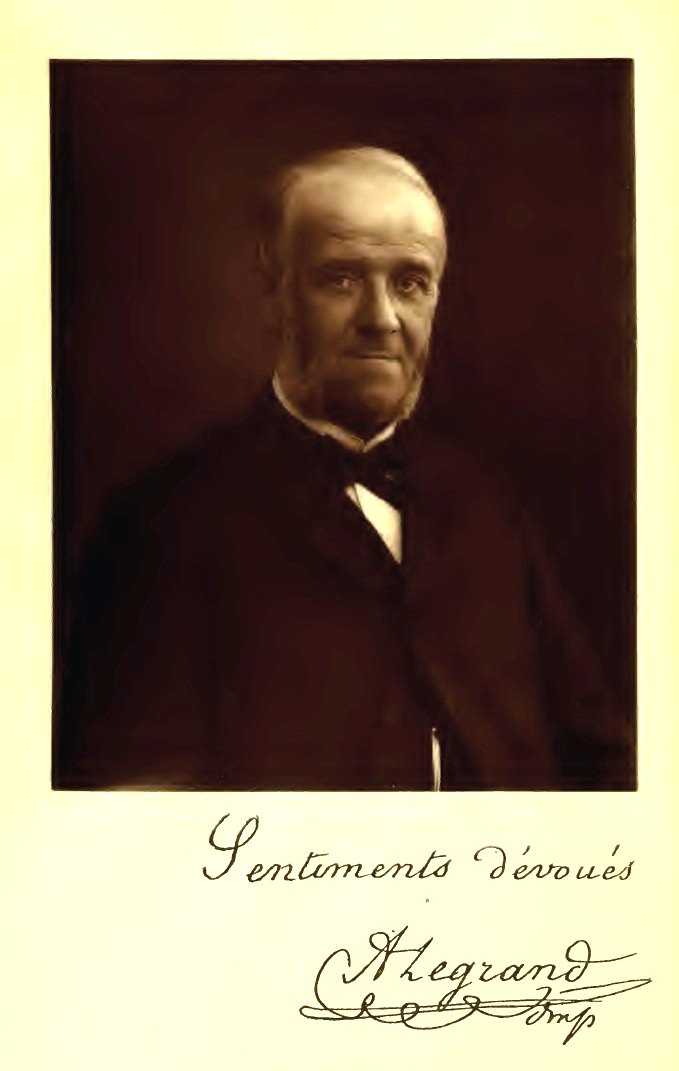
Jacques Legrand and signature as pictured in The Philatelic Record, 1885.

Dr. Jacques Amable Legrand (29 August 1820 – 6 June 1912) was one of the first collectors of French stamps in the nineteenth century and one of the first organizers and scholars of philately in France as a serious topic of study. He used the pseudonym of Dr. Magnus.

== Career ==
He participated actively in the journal Le Timbrophile and invented the perforation gauge, or odontometer, which has become a basic tool in determining the perforation of stamps.

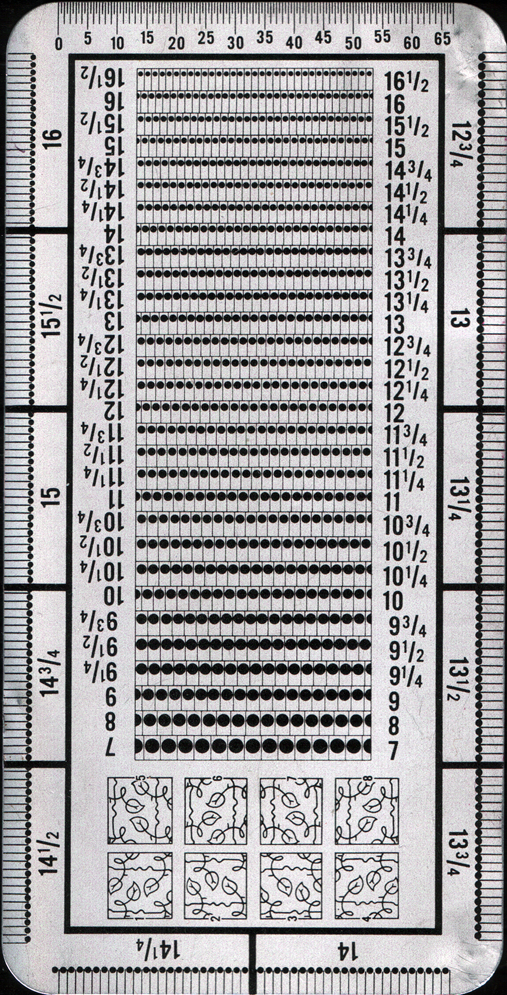
Legrand invented the perforation gauge, or odontometer, in 1866

He also fought an unsuccessful battle to reject the title of the subject advocated by Georges Herpin and Arthur Maury as "philately" and sought it to be renamed "Timbrology".

Jacques Legrand was one of the founders on 14 June 1875 of the Société Française de Timbrologie, one of the most important philatelic institutions in France, and served as its first secretary. Arthur de Rothschild became its president. Early members included Arthur Maury, despite his disagreement with Legrand over the word philately, and the painter Gustave Caillebotte.

Dr. Legrand was the Redactor of review "Le timbre fiscal", published by J. B. Moens, since January 1874, and an honorary member of the Fiscal Philatelic Society.

== Publications ==
Les écritures et la légende des timbres du Japon, 1878. (A study of early stamps of Japan.)

== References and sources ==
Sources

- Société Française de Timbrologie (in French)
- Dr. Jacques Amable Legrand. American Philatelic Society. Retrieved 2019-02-23.
