= A. B. Kay =

British stamp dealer

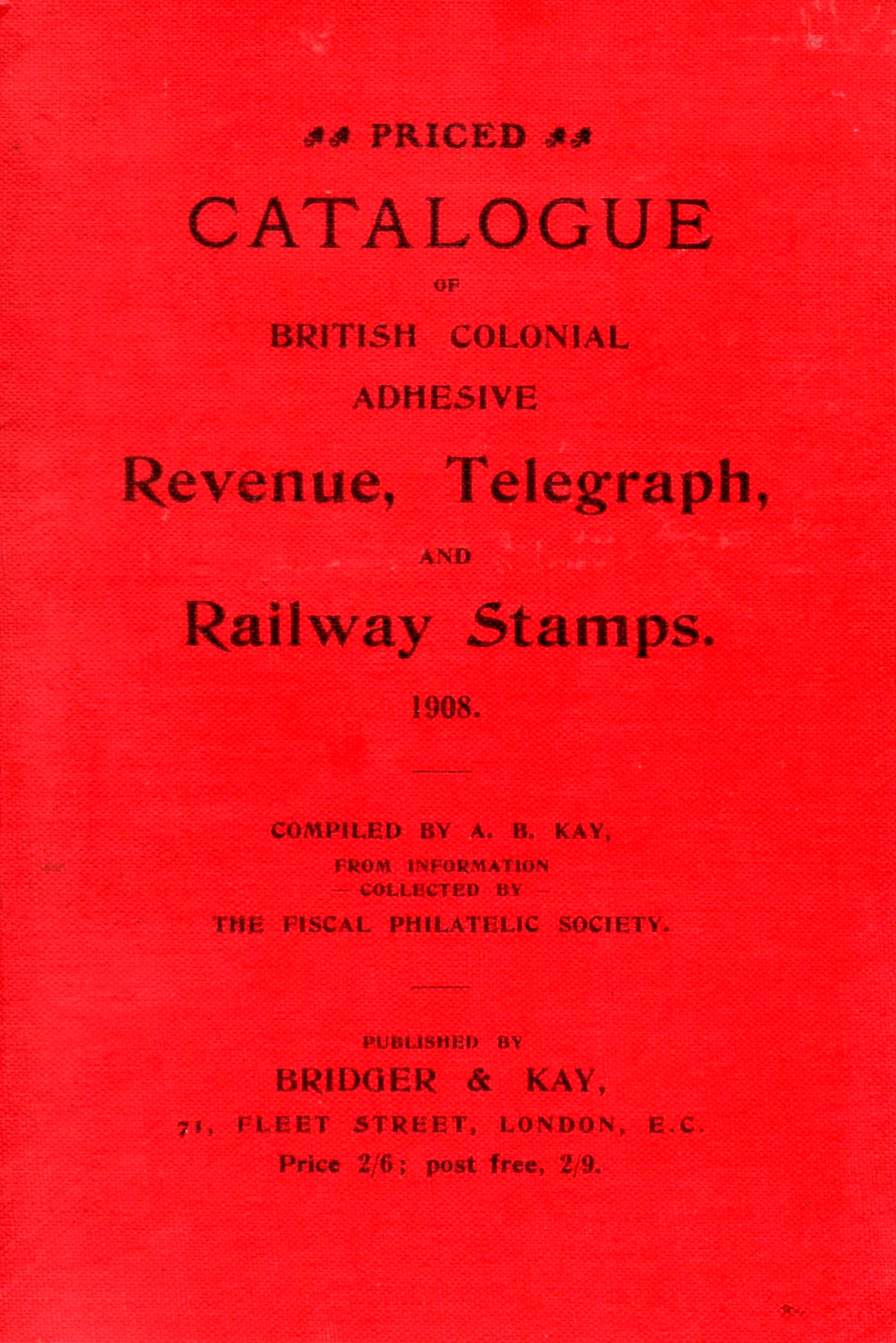
The cover of a 1908 work by Kay.

Alexander Berridge Kay (1879 – 4 December 1944) was the founder, with E.J. Bridger, of the stamp dealers Bridger and Kay in 1897 or 1898 and a leading figure in the Fiscal Philatelic Society. In 1910, Kay identified used copies of the Italian forgery of the British grey-green Victorian 10 shilling stamp watermarked anchor and perforated 14. His letter to The London Philatelist, published in November 1910, warned the philatelic community of its existence.

== Bridger & Kay ==
The firm of Bridger & Kay was formed in 1897 or 1898. Bridger and Kay had both been civil servants previously. Later, Bernard Leverton joined, and his son Allan Leverton in 1942. The firm was first located at 71 Fleet Street, London E.C., then Aldwych, moving to The Strand in 1938 and to Pall Mall in 1978 under Allan Leverton's stewardship. The firm continued until it went out of business in 1995. It was then purchased by the Bristol stamp dealer Steve Ellis.

== Organised philately ==
Kay was the founder Secretary, Treasurer and Exchange Superintendent of the Fiscal Philatelic Society in 1902 continuing in those roles until the FPS amalgamated with the International Philatelic Union in 1920. The FPS proceedings record the numerous displays of stamps that he gave at FPS meetings. Kay also served on the British Philatelic Association expert committee.

== Legacy ==
In 1949, Kay's collection of British Colonial Revenue stamps to about 1940 was donated to the British Museum by his children Miss Nora Kay and Mr Frank Kay. The collection is now part of the British Library Philatelic Collections as the Kay Collection.

== Publications ==
- Priced Catalogue of British Colonial Adhesive Revenue, Telegraph, and Railway Stamps 1908, Bridger & Kay, London, 1908.
- "Canadian Bill Stamps" in The Bulletin Of The Fiscal Philatelic Society, Vol.II, No.7, pp. 63–70.
- "The Revenue Stamps of British Guiana" in The Bulletin Of The Fiscal Philatelic Society, Vol.II, No.9, pp. 84–92.
