= Walter Morley =

English philatelist, stamp dealer and author (1863–1936)

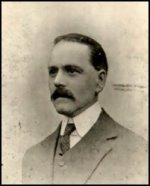
Walter Morley.

Walter Morley (1863–1936) was a pioneering English philatelist, stamp dealer and philatelic author.

The first address known for Morley is 186 West Green Road, Tottenham, London N. In 1898 his address is given as 15 Brownhill Gardens, Hither Green, Catford, London S.E. and by 1910 as 325 Brownhill Road, Catford, London S.E.

== Philatelic publishing ==
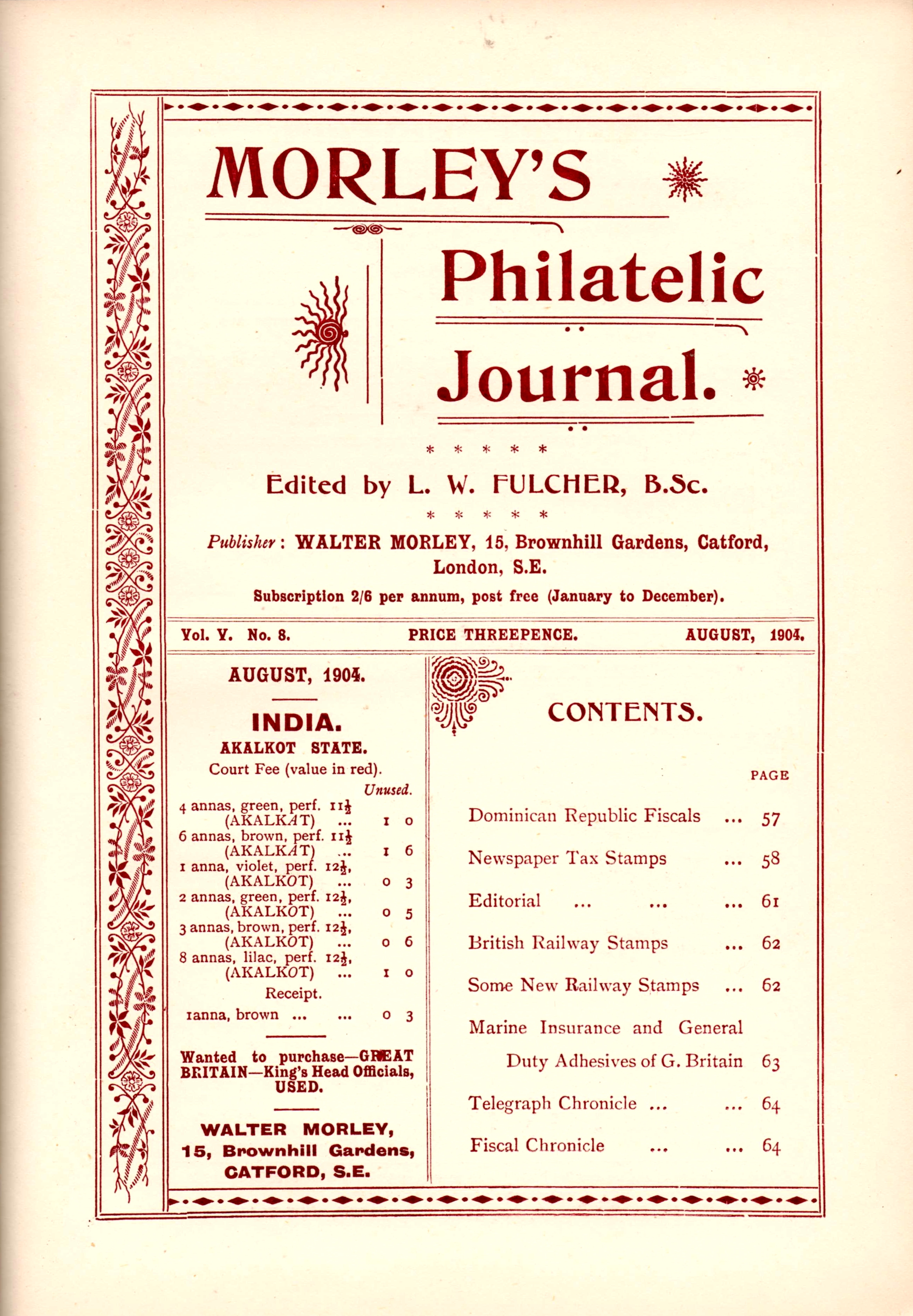
The title page from a 1904 edition of Morley's Philatelic Journal.

Morley was responsible for many early works on revenue, railway and telegraph stamps, as author or publisher. His 1910 revenue catalogue lists his numerous exhibition medals, including Silver in Paris 1892, Gold in Paris 1894, Silver in London 1897 and Gold in Paris again in 1900, all for displays of Fiscal or Telegraph stamps. Morley also won many other medals and awards during his career.

He published, with Fred G. Lundy, The Fiscal Philatelist and Revenue Stamp Guide: a monthly journal devoted to fiscal collectors, which ran from December 1892.

In 1898 he and G.C. Lundy produced an Album for the Revenue Stamps of the British Colonies in two volumes.

Later, he was responsible for Morley's Philatelic Journal, A Monthly Paper For Collectors of Postage, Revenue, Telegraph and Railway stamps between 1900 and 1908 which was edited by A. Preston (Volume 1) and then Lionel Fulcher.

== Organised philately ==
Morley was Vice-President of the Fiscal Philatelic Society until it ceased in 1928 and a member of the founding committee of the City of London Philatelic Club. Stanley Gibbons Monthly Journal for 30 January 1892 (p. 199) records his membership of the Amateur Stamp Collector's Club.

== The Prince Consort essay ==
According to a report in The London Philatelist, journal of the Royal Philatelic Society London, Morley presented an example in black of the famous Prince Consort Essay to the Tapling Collection which is now housed in The British Museum. He also offered a copy for sale in the June and July 1902 issues of Morley's Philatelic Journal at a price of 50 shillings, ten shillings more than he was then asking for a mint Penny Black.

== Publications (as author or publisher) ==
Walter Morley's roles as author or publisher often overlapped and it is likely that he was a contributor to many works where he is only credited as a publisher, hence all works published or authored by him are included here:

- Varieties of the Penny Black.
- Varieties of The Penny Red.
- The Fiscal Philatelist and Revenue Stamp Guide, 1892-93.
- Stamps of Great Britain, 1893.
- The Embossed Deed Stamps of Great Britain, 1893.
- A Complete Priced Catalogue of the Postal and Telegraph Adhesives of Great Britain by Walter Morley, Herbert L'Estrange Ewen & Harry Hilckes: Hilckes, Kirkpatrick & Co., London, c. 1894.
- Handbook of the Revenue Stamps of Great Britain and Ireland by F.G. Lundy, 1894.
- Catalogue and Price List of the Stamps of Great Britain including Fiscals, Railway Stamps etc., 1895. (Second edition 1897)
- Walter Morley's Catalogue and Price List of the Revenue Stamps of the British Colonies, 1895.
- Walter Morley’s Revised Catalogue and Price List of the Government Issued Envelopes, Registered Envelopes, Newsbands and Post Cards of Great Britain, 1897.
- Album for the Revenue Stamps of the British Colonies, with G.C. Lundy, 1898. (two volumes)
- Morley's Catalogue of the Telegraph Stamps of the World, 1900.
- Morley’s Philatelic Journal, 1900-1908.
- Catalogue of the Revenue Stamps of Spain and Colonies, including the American Occupation and Revolutionary Issues by L.W. Fulcher, 1902.
- Catalogue of the Revenue Stamps of South America. Being a supplement to Morley's Philatelic Journal, 1901-04, 1904.
- The Revenue Stamps of the Dominican Republic (Morley's Philatelic Journal), 1904.
- Catalogue of the Revenue Stamps of the United States, Mexico, and the States of Central America, published as a supplement to Morley's Philatelic Journal, 1905 - c. 1907.
- Walter Morley's Catalogue of the Revenue Stamps of the British Colonies Including Railway Stamps, 3rd edition, London, 1910.
- The Embossed Revenue Stamps of Great Britain and Ireland, 1911.
- Walter Morley's Catalogue and Price List of the Newspaper Tax Stamps of Great Britain and Ireland, 1912.
- Old Irish postage stamps and franks by F.W. Meredith with a catalogue priced by Walter Morley, 1923.
- "Arab, Syria" in The Collectors Club Philatelist, Vol.14, No.2, 1935.
- Walter Morley's Catalogue of the Revenue Stamps of the British Colonies including Railway Stamps, 3rd edition, Facsimile, Templar House Books, Reading, Berkshire, 2010.

== See also ==
- Alfred Forbin
- Railway stamp
- Revenue stamp
