= Edward Baldock =

Edward Baldock may refer to:

- Edward Baldock (murder victim)
- Edward Holmes Baldock (1812–1875), British politician
- Edward Holmes Baldock (dealer) (1777–1845), his father, London furniture dealer
