= Lionel Fulcher =

British philatelist

Lionel William Fulcher B.Sc. (3 January 1866 – 11 May 1945) was a British philatelist who co-edited, with Stanley Phillips, Gibbons Stamp Monthly, was Vice President of the International Philatelic Union and was a key figure in the Fiscal Philatelic Society. He was an expert on the early stamps of Japan and also studied Venezuela, Peru, Nicaragua, Papal States and Norway.

He was for a time the editor of Morley's Philatelic Journal, A Monthly Paper For Collectors of Postage, Revenue, Telegraph and Railway stamps and also of The Philatelic Record.

Fulcher was a member of the Royal Philatelic Society London from 1901 where he also became the Honorary Librarian and was a frequent exhibitor at meetings.

In 1921, Fulcher was entered on the Roll of Distinguished Philatelists.

== Outside philately ==
Professionally, Fulcher was employed as an Assistant Keeper at the Science Museum, South Kensington, retiring in 1928.

== Publications ==
- Catalogue of the revenue stamps of Spain and Colonies, including the American occupation and revolutionary issues. London: Walter Morley, 1902.
- Roman States. Philatelic Record, 1912.
- The Postage Stamps of Venezuela. (Reprinted from the London Philatelist.) [With plates.]. London: L. Fulcher & T. W. Hall, 1924. (With T. W. Hall)
