= Ewen Collection =

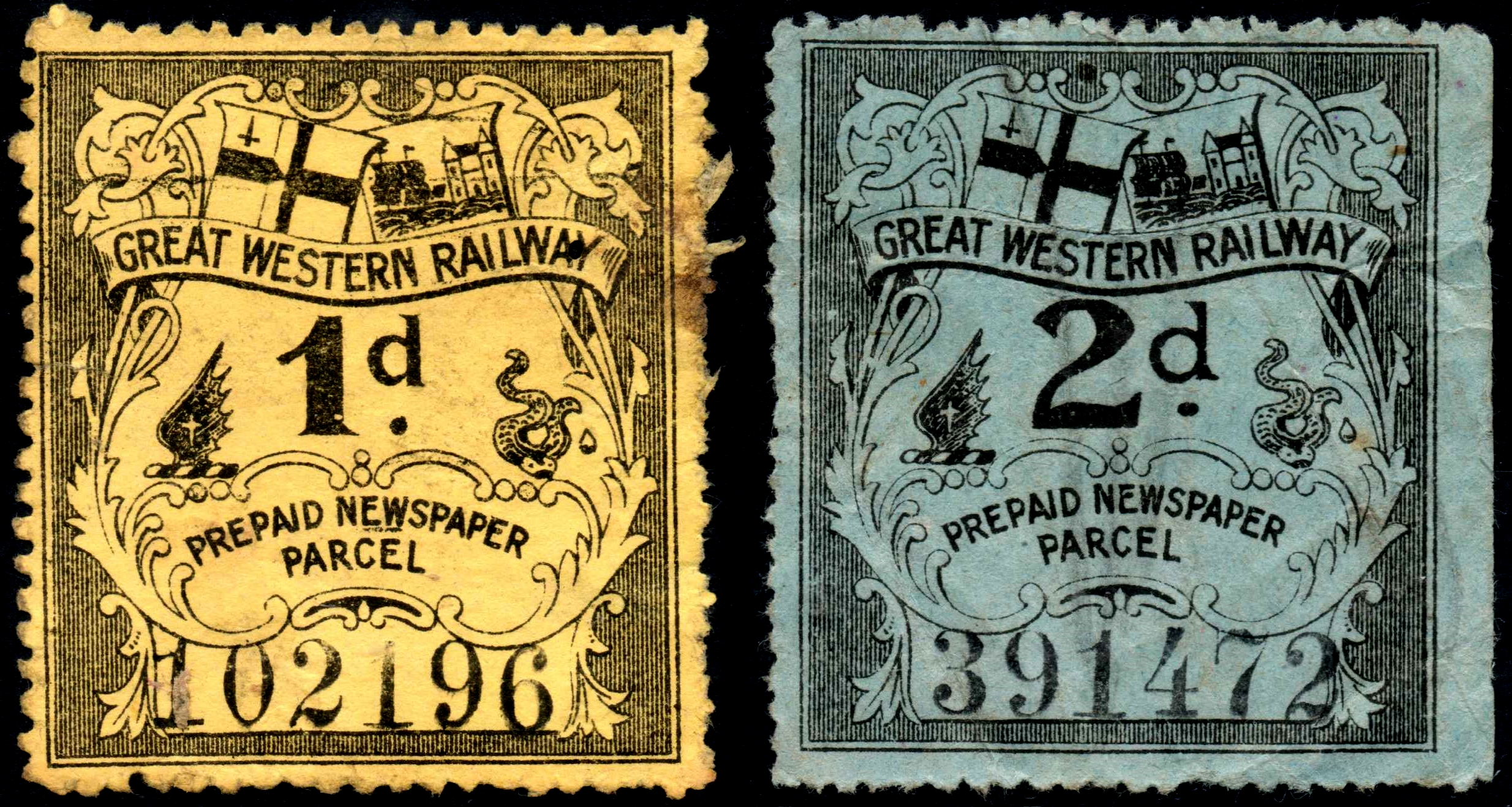
British Great Western Railway newspaper parcel stamps (not from the Ewen Collection).

The Ewen Collection is a collection of railway letter stamps of the United Kingdom from 1891 to 1912 that forms part of the British Library Philatelic Collections. It was formed by Herbert L'Estrange Ewen and donated in 1949 by his sister Mrs. Clement Williams.

== See also ==
- Parcel stamp
- Turner Collection of Railway Letter Stamps
