= American Revenue Association =

The American Revenue Association was founded in 1947 and is a "non-profit corporation serving the needs and interests of all collectors of revenues, tax stamps, stamped paper, telegraph and railroad stamps, and general non-postal Back-of-the-Book material".

The association is run by a board of directors assisted by officers. The president is Robert Hohertz. Notable members include the prominent stamp dealer Eric Jackson, Martin Erler in Germany, E.S.J. van Dam in Canada and A.M. Mollah in India.

== Journal ==
The official journal of the association is The American Revenuer, which is now in its 63rd volume.

== Affiliations ==
The association is affiliate No.51 of the American Philatelic Society.

== Selected publications ==
The association has published the following books, amongst others:

- Combs, W.V. Second Federal Issue 1801–1802: U.S. Embossed Revenue Stamped Paper. ISBN 0-945735-00-6
- Combs, W.V. Third Federal Issue 1814-1817 and other U.S. Embossed Revenue Stamped Paper 1791-1869. ISBN 0-945735-01-4
- Mahler, Michael. A catalog of United States revenue-stamped documents of the Civil War era by type and tax rate.
- Riley, R.F. (1997), Riley's fiscal philatelic literature handbook, American Revenue Association, OCLC 42677110

== See also ==
- Cinderella Stamp Club
- Fiscal Philatelic Society
- Revenue Society
