= Creeke =

Creeke is a surname. Notable people with the surname include:

- A. B. Creeke (1860–1932), British solicitor and early philatelist
- Christopher Crabb Creeke (1820–1886), British architect and surveyor
