= Herpin =

Herpin may refer to:

- René Herpin, pseudonym of Jean Bodin (c. 1530 – 1596), French jurist and political philosopher
- Théodore Herpin (1799–1865), French and Swiss neurologist
- Georges Herpin (philatelist) (1820–1900), French stamp collector
- Nicolas Herpin (born 1942), French sociologist
