= Oswald Marsh =

British stamp dealer (1880–1951)

- Born: 26 October 1880; Belfast, Northern Ireland
- Died: 4 August 1951 (aged 70)
- Occupation: Stamp dealer

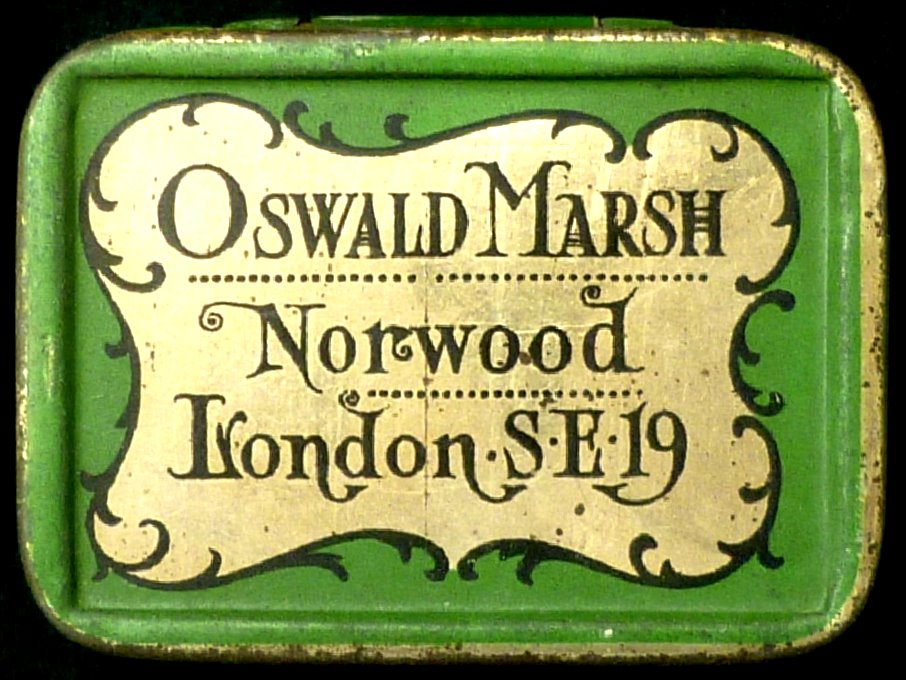
Oswald Marsh branded metal tin, probably for stamp hinges.

Oswald Marsh (26 October 1880 – 4 August 1951) was a London stamp dealer who specialised in cut-outs. Many Marsh covers have addresses created using addressograph plates. Oswald Marsh was not related to Victor Marsh.

== Stamp dealing ==
Born in Belfast, into a Quaker family, his father Joseph Chandler Marsh, born in Surrey, was an architect practicing in Belfast. Marsh moved to London around 1900 where he had several addresses in the suburb of Norwood. He also briefly had offices at 1 Exeter Street, London W1, around 1914. Marsh appears to have started his stamp business some time after 1900. He is thanked in the preface to Herbert L'Estrange Ewen's Priced Catalogue of the Unadhesive Postage Stamps of the UK 1840-1905 which was published in 1905 and was well established enough to publish a book by W.H. Bertram Poole in 1906. Marsh and Ewen must have been well known to each other as Norwood stamp dealers who both had an interest in "unadhesive stamps", or cut-outs as they are now known.

Marsh specialised in British and Commonwealth stamps, controls, and cut-outs from British postal stationery which adorned much of his outgoing mail. He also ran a new issue service.

== Organised philately ==
Marsh was a life member of the Fiscal Philatelic Society.

== Books and journals ==
Marsh produced several journals, including Marsh's Monthly Offers from 1910, Marsh's Weekly Circular (1908 to 1921) which was renamed Marsh's Weekly Philatelist in 1914 and Marsh's Colonial Philatelist from 1928.

As publisher, Marsh also produced The Postage Stamps of the Seychelles by W.H. Bertram Poole in 1906 and Sam Buckley's Marginal Varieties of the Edwardian Stamps of Great Britain, 1902-1912 in 1912.

Marsh also acquired the business of Errington & Martin, trade binders and producers of stamp albums.

== Death ==
Marsh continued in business until his death in 1951, after which it was taken over by his son Herbert and daughter. The stock was eventually dispersed through a series of sales continuing up to 2008.

Oswald's obituary was published in The Philatelic Journal, July/September 1951, p. 66.

== Publications ==
- Oswald Marsh's Priced Catalogue of King George Controls. Norwood, 1918.
