= Jean-Baptiste Moens =

Belgian philatelist (1833-1908)

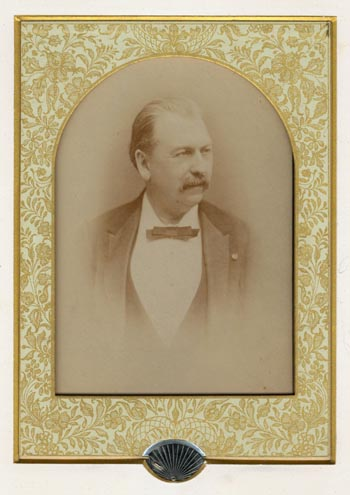
- Jean-Baptiste Moens, 1887
- Born: 27 May 1833; Tournai
- Died: 28 April 1908 (aged 74)

Jean-Baptiste Philippe Constant Moens (27 May 1833, Tournai – 28 April 1908) was a Belgian philatelist recognized as the first dealer in stamps for collectors. He was one of the original philatelic journalists.

== Youth ==
Moens began collecting stamps from his family's mail as a boy in Tournai. He was the son of Colette Blangenois and Phillipe Moens, a soldier. He began with a small business in coins. By 1853, at age nineteen, he was buying and selling new and second-hand books, and stamps, from the Bortier Gallery, a covered walkway in central Brussels. Within a decade he was putting out a stamp catalog with illustrated supplements.

== First catalogue ==
In March 1862, with Louis Hanciau, Moens published a catalog of stamps, the Manuel des collectionneurs de timbres-poste (Handbook for Stamp Collectors). This work is the first of its kind in Belgium and the second in the French language, following that of the Parisian, Alfred Potiquet. Also in 1862, he published De la falsification des timbres-poste (On the falsification of postage stamps) to alert stamp enthusiasts to the abundance of forgeries. He began the first French language philatelic monthly, Le Timbre-Poste, which ran from 1863 until 1900, as well as a series on fiscal stamps from 1874 until 1896.

== The Mauritius "Post Office" stamps ==
Moens became the owner of eight of the "Post Office" Mauritius stamps. In 1878 Moens published the first of his works on the early stamps of Mauritius, Les Timbres de Maurice depuis leur origine jusqu'à nos jours, (The Stamps of Mauritius from their Origin until Today), benefiting from the studies of Edward B. Evans, the Philatelic Society of London, and Judge Frederick Philbrick. Helen Morgan noted, "All that is known of the discovery of the first specimens of the Post Office issue, indeed of much of the history of the handful of those stamps eventually found, came from his pen in the late 1890s. He handled most of the Post Office stamps discovered by Madame Borchard in the late 1860s."

== Organised philately ==
Moens was an Honorary Member of the Fiscal Philatelic Society until his death.

== Retirement ==
As Moens' business prospered, he assembled a large stock of collectibles of all kinds and a library devoted to music and antiquities, as well as stamps. By 1 November 1899, to preserve his health, Jean-Baptiste announced in Le Timbre-poste that the time had come to free himself from the duties of publication and to liquidate most of his stock in trade. After selling his rarities, the residue of Moens' stock, with a catalogue value of £196,000 (1882 catalogue), was sold the following year to M Rubens, a stamp dealer of Copenhagen for an undisclosed figure. His philatelic publications were eventually sold to H. Edgar Weston, in London, in 1907.

== Death ==
Jean-Baptiste Moens died in Ixelles in 1908 and was interred in Ixelles Cemetery. His passing was noted by the philatelic press, many referring to him as The Father of Philately.
