= Kay Collection =

The Kay Collection is a collection of revenue stamps of the British Commonwealth to 1940 that forms part of the British Library Philatelic Collections. It was formed by A. B. Kay and originally donated to the British Museum by Kay's children Miss Nora Kay and Mr F. R. Kay in 1949. As of October 2007 it was held in eight boxes and 20 loose-leaf folders.
