= Cut-out (philately) =

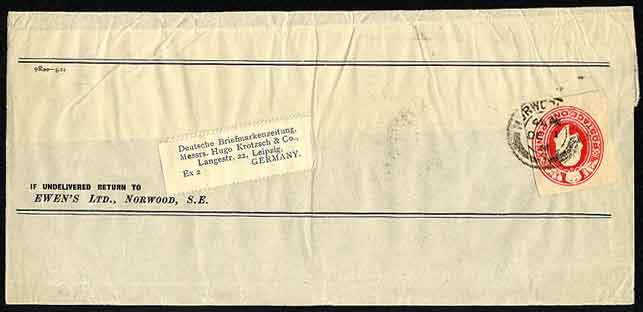
A newspaper wrapper stamped with a cut-out and sent out in 1911 from the Ewen's company to Germany

In philately, a cut-out is an imprinted stamp cut from an item of postal stationery, such as a postal card, letter sheet, aerogramme or wrapper, that may have been used as a normal stamp.

== Historical aspects ==
In Great Britain the postal use of cut-outs was banned under the Post Office Act of 1870. This prohibition was in force until 31 December 1904. In 1905, Herbert L'Estrange Ewen published a booklet "The Unadhesive Postage Stamps of the UK" meaning postal stationery cut-outs.

== Forms of cut-outs ==
=== Cut Square ===
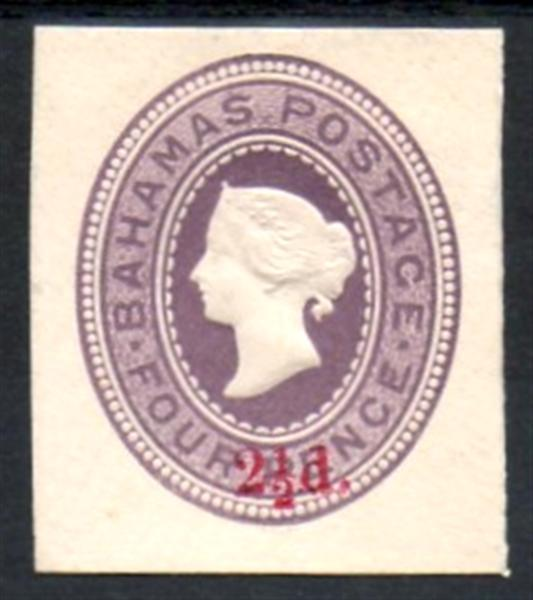
A Bahamas 4d imprinted stamp cut square from a piece of postal stationery overprinted 2½d

A cut square has been cut in a square or rectangular shape. An alternative use of the term is simply any stamp, from sheets or postal stationery, cut in a square or rectangular shape and not cut to shape.

It is distinguished from the entire (the complete postal stationery item) or the more common practice of earlier eras of cutting to shape by removing all of the paper apart from the imprinted stamp. A variant of the cut square is the full corner which is a cutting of the corner to include the intact flap and back of the envelope as well as the front.

Just as used postage stamps were cut out, soaked and placed in an album, collectors also cut out postal stationery indicia and mounted them conveniently in albums. Now, the practice is frowned upon by most collectors who collect the entire, thus saving the envelope's postal history, the knife of the envelope and the postmark. To illustrate how far things have shifted in emphasis from the collection of cut squares, the most recent United Postal Stationery Society publication on US 20th and 21st century stamped envelopes does not even mention cut squares, whereas its predecessor edition, just seven years earlier, devoted a section to their pricing.

The term cut square is differentiated from the term used on piece which denotes an adhesive stamp cut out in similar fashion from the original cover so as to preserve the entire postmark.

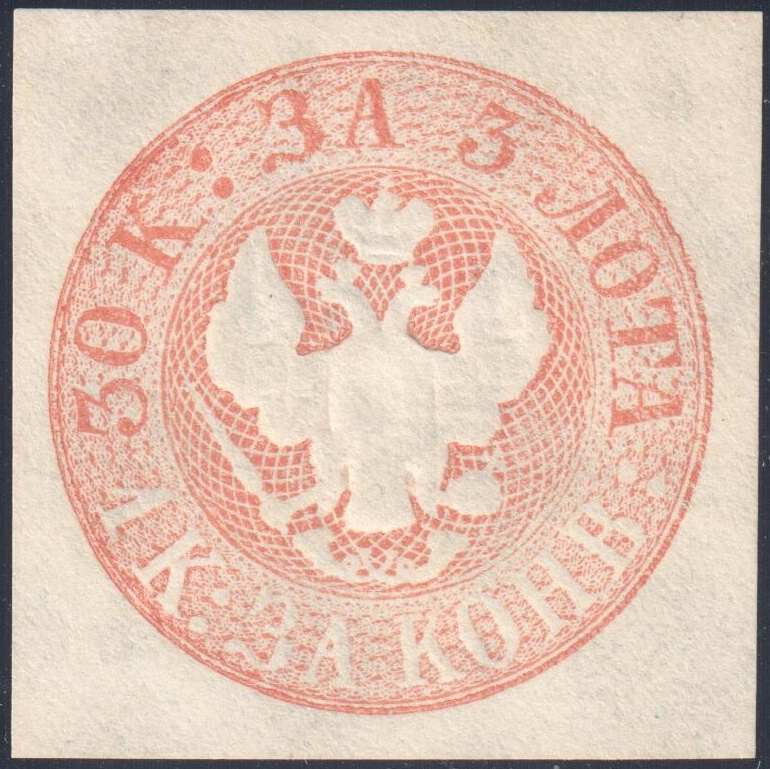
Russia 1849, 30k unused cut square

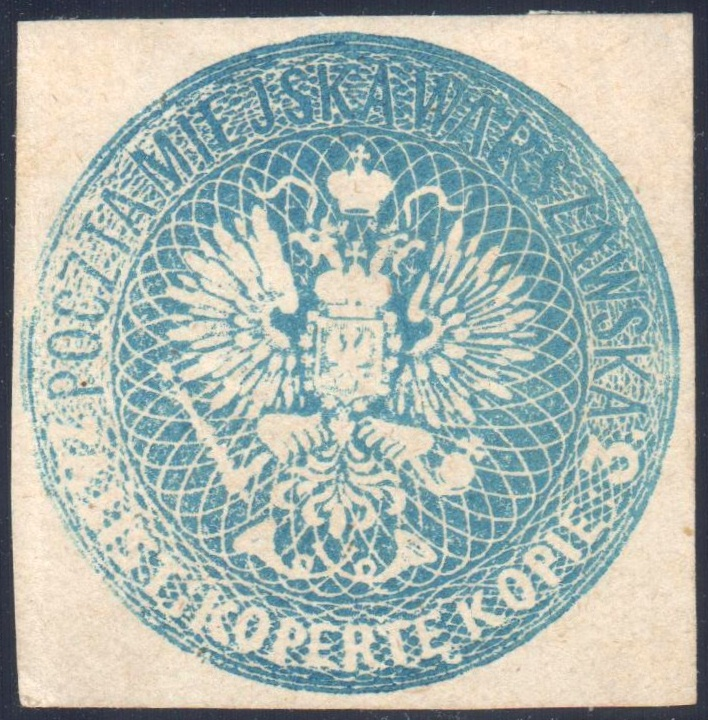
Poland 1860, 3k unused cut square

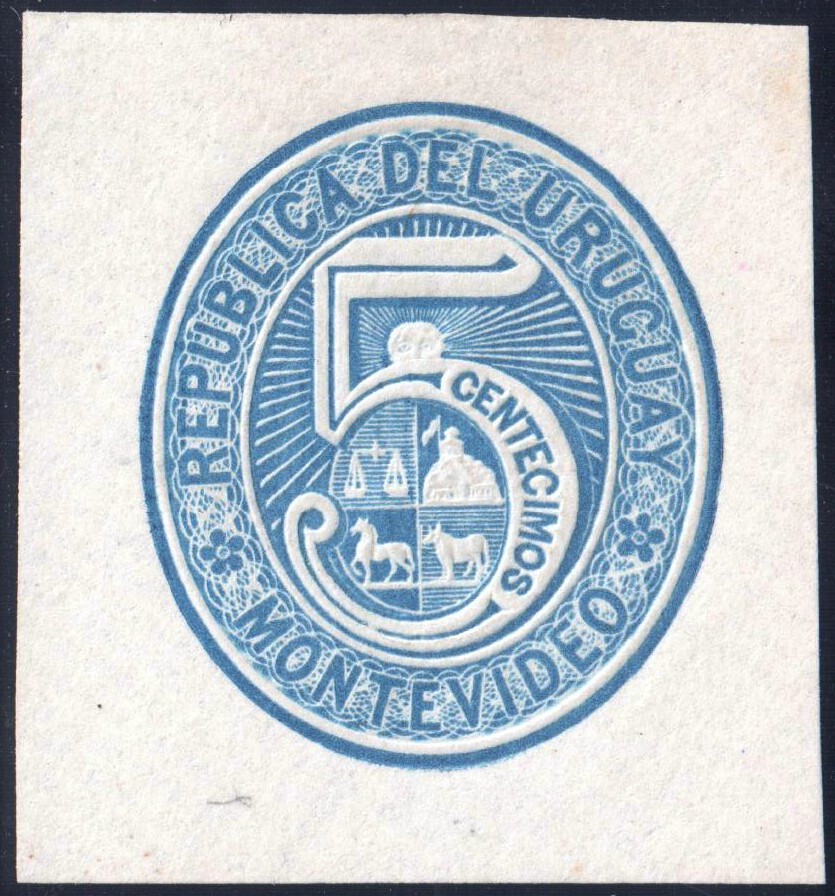
Uruguay 1866, 5c unused cut square

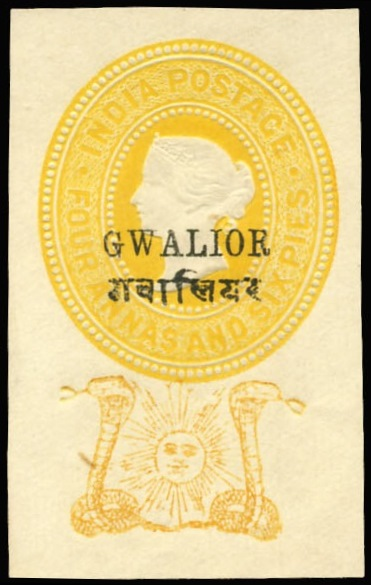
Gwalior 1886, 4A6P unused cut square

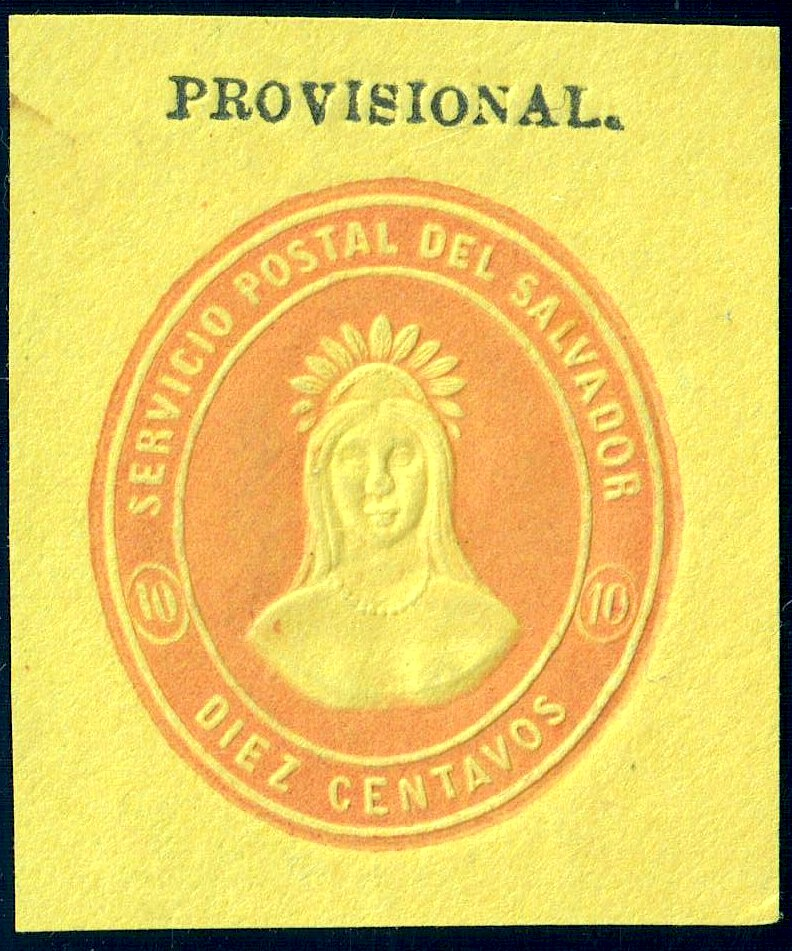
El Salvador 1887, 10c unused cut square

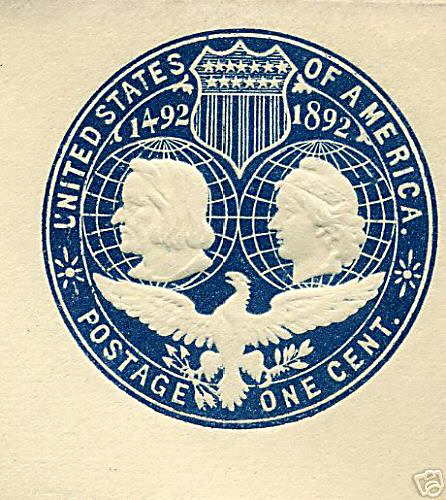
USA 1892, 1c unused cut square

=== Cut to shape ===
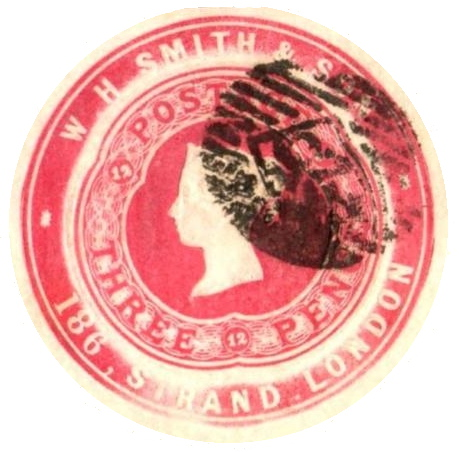
Advertising ring indicia cut to shape

Cut to shape refer to an indicium that has been cut to the shape of the design, such as an octagon, circle or oval, instead of simply cut into a square or rectangular shape.

Stamps cut to shape almost always command a lower price than those that have been cut square, and sometimes have little or no value, especially envelope indicia cut to shape. Although many stamps unfortunately have been cut to shape by stamp collectors, some early stamps were produced without perforations and were often cut to shape by people before they affixed the stamps to their envelopes. This is true, for example, for the octagon-shaped 4 annas stamp of India issued in 1854, which is most commonly found cut to shape on envelopes or pieces.

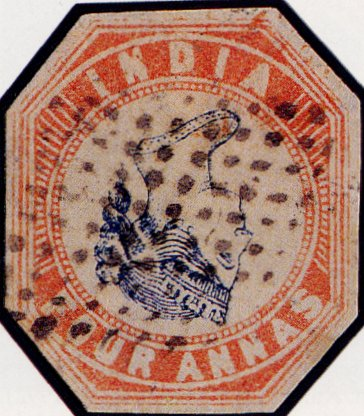
India 1854 (inverted head), cut to shape

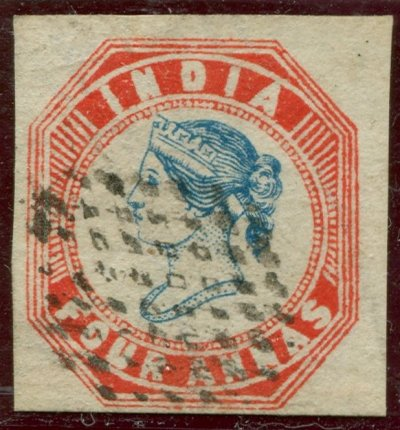
India 1854, cut square

All of the surviving examples of the India 1854 (inverted head) are postally used. Only two (or three) are known cut square; another 24 or so, are cut to shape (in an octagonal shape). One from the collection of the Earl of Crawford was exhibited in the World Philatelic Exhibition in Washington in 2006.

The "world's most famous stamp" — the unique 1856 British Guiana 1c magenta — is cut into an octagonal shape. Consequently, it has been referred to as being cut to shape, although technically that term is incorrect as the stamp design is rectangular in shape.

== See also ==
- Oswald Marsh
- Herbert Edgar Weston
