= Perforation gauge =

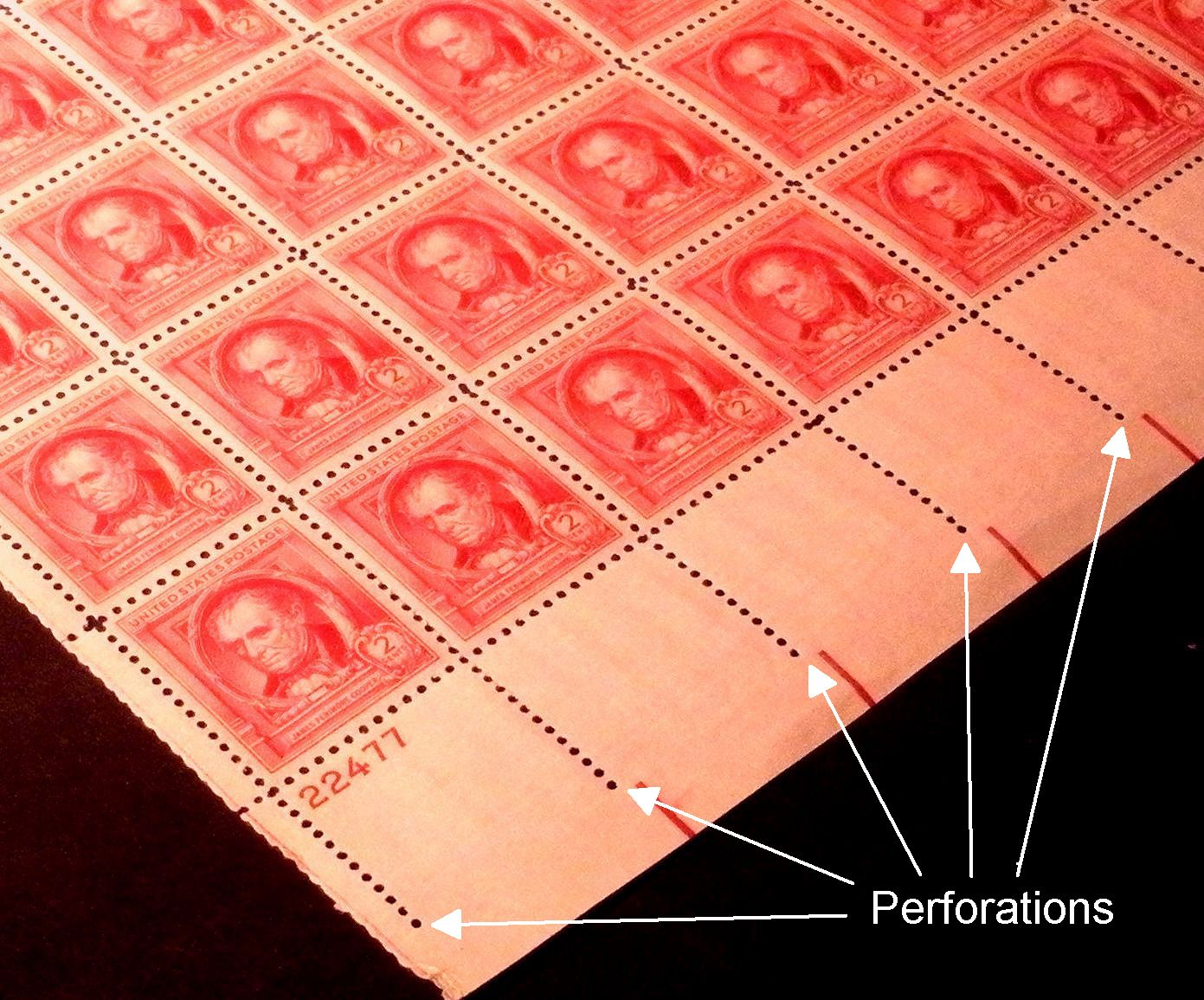
A perforated sheet of US stamps. The spacing of the perforations, or gauge, can influence the scarcity and therefore value of a stamp.

In philatelic terminology, perforation gauge has two meanings:

- As a term for classification. The "perforation gauge" of a stamp specifies the number of perforation holes that appear in a two-centimeter span along its edge. The finest gauge ever used is 18 on stamps of the Malay States in the early 1950s, and the coarsest is 2, seen on the 1891 stamps of Bhopal. Modern stamp perforations tend to range from 11 to 14. Many stamps are produced with "compound perforations" i. e., the vertical and horizontal perforations will be of different gauges. Many U. S. stamps have been perforated 10½ x 11.
- As the name for a philatelic tool used to measure perforations. Invented in 1866 by Jacques Legrand, the typical "perf gauge" (sometimes called an odontometer) is a metal or plastic tile on which perforations of gauges ranging from 7 and 7½ to 16 and 16½ are marked (the marks sometimes appear at the edges of the tile). Besides these more traditional tools there are now digital perforation gauges, such as PerfGauge, that measure directly on mobile phone and tablet screens. The philatelist places each of these depictions beside a stamp until one is found that exactly matches the stamp’s perforations and with digital gauges it is also possible to smoothly change the scale to fit the stamps perforations. Such a gauge is an indispensable tool for identifying stamps that present identical images but have been issued with perforations of several different sizes. An extreme example is the U. S. Washington–Franklin Issues, some of which are found with perforations of gauges 8½, 10, 11, 12, and 12½.

== See also ==
- Postage stamp separation

== References and sources ==
Sources

- L.N. Williams, Fundamentals of Philately (American Philatelic Society, 1990) chap. 15 ISBN 0-933580-13-4
