= A. B. Creeke =

English solicitor and early philatelist

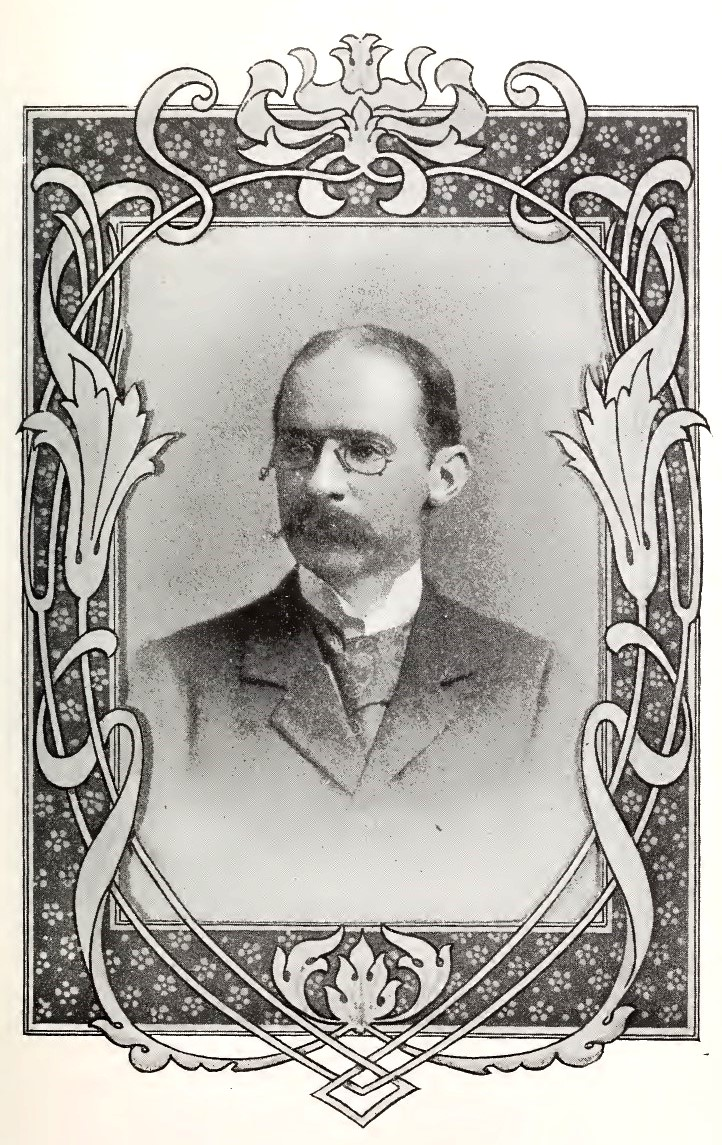
- Creeke in The Philatelic Record 1901.
- Born: 25 September 1860; Habergham Eaves, Burnley
- Died: 25 July 1932 (aged 71); London
- Occupation: Solicitor

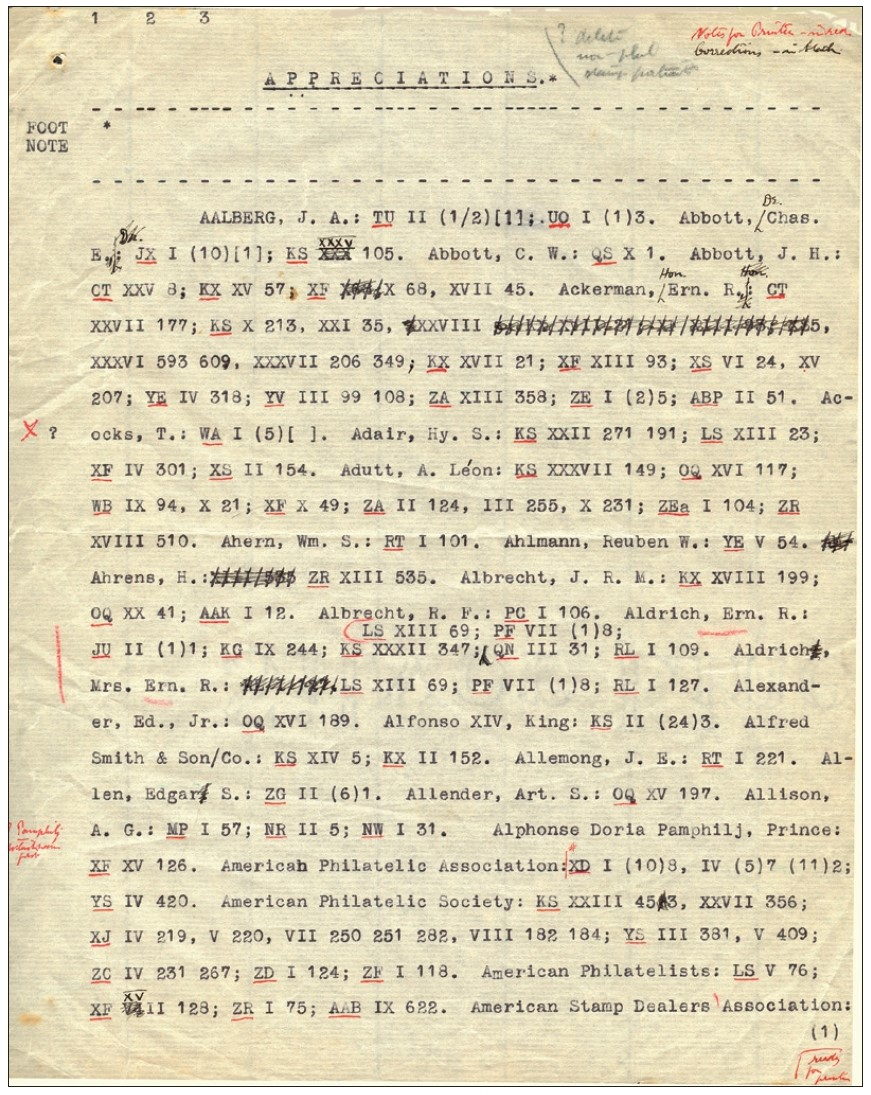
A type-written page from the Creeke Index.

Anthony Buck Creeke Jr. (25 September 1860 – 25 July 1932) was an English solicitor and early philatelist who edited Stamp Collector's Fortnightly and The British Philatelist. In 1903, he was sentenced to six months in jail for trafficking illegally in British official stamps that should not have been available to the public in unused condition. He was removed from the roll of solicitors but reinstated in 1913.

== Early life ==
Anthony Buck Creeke Junior was born in Habergham Eaves, Burnley, Lancashire, on 25 September 1860, to Anthony Buck Creeke, an attorney, and his wife Catharine Elizabeth Creeke. The family were wealthy and in 1871 employed six servants. By 1881, Creeke senior was described as a solicitor and town clerk of Burnley.

== Family ==
Creeke married Miriam Agnes Collick in London in 1891. In the 1911 census they are recorded as having two sons and five daughters.

== Philately ==
He was an early philatelist who edited Stamp Collector's Fortnightly and The British Philatelist. His close friend and collaborator in philatelic matters was Hastings E. Wright (died 1897).

=== Official stamps case ===
In 1903, Creeke was sentenced to six months in jail for trafficking illegally in Official Inland Revenue stamps that should not have been available to the public in unused condition. The case caused him to be removed from the roll of solicitors, though he was reinstated in 1913, and may be the reason why he never signed the Roll of Distinguished Philatelists, despite the selector's original intention that he should. King George V was the first signatory.

=== The Creeke Index ===
Creeke prepared an index to 800 philatelic journals in English from 1862 to about 1928 along with Le Timbre-Poste. The index, which is now known as The Creeke Index, was sold to the Royal Philatelic Society London in 1936 by Creeke's widow who had been unable to find a publisher for it. Charles Nissen facilitated the sale. The London Philatelist noted its receipt and hoped it would be of great assistance to researchers but also commented on the fact that the costs of production would render publication impossible. In fact, the index, which was in manuscript and typescript form and hard to understand, was placed in a basement storage room and largely forgotten until the 21st century when it was restructured by Brian Birch of the Royal Philatelic Society London.

== Career ==
Creeke qualified as a solicitor but was removed from the roll following his imprisonment in 1903. At the time of the 1911 census he was recorded as working as a journalist. He was reinstated as a solicitor in 1913.

== Death ==
Creeke died on 25 July 1932. His residence at the time of his death was 33 Church Crescent, Muswell Hill, London. He left an estate of £824.

== Selected publications ==
- A history of the adhesive stamps of the British Isles available for postal and telegraph purposes. London, Philatelic Society, London, 1899. (With Hastings E. Wright)
- Stamp collecting - A guide for beginners. London, Thomas Nelson & Sons, c. 1914.
