= Martin Erler =

German philatelist (1920–2014)

Martin Erler

Martin Erler (c. 1920 – 11 August 2014) was a German philatelist who was an expert on the revenue stamps of Germany who with John A. Norton (died June 1980) wrote the only comprehensive catalogue of German revenue stamps.

== Publications ==
The first volumes of the Erler catalogue were based mainly on the author's own collections and a 1961 work by John Norton. Later volumes were prepared from the author's research and as new items come on to the philatelic market.

Erler also wrote a number of other works on revenue philately on subjects about which little else has been published and contributed many articles to The American Revenuer, the journal of the American Revenue Association.

== Organised philately ==
Erler was a member of the Royal Philatelic Society London (RPSL) since 1990 and was made a Fellow in 1992. In April 1991, Erler gave a display to the RPSL on the Revenue Stamped Papers in the Wurzburg Area of Northern Bavaria during Napoleonic Times, which was described by Clive Akerman as including material of the "utmost rarity".

Erler has been credited with being one of the individuals who was instrumental in having revenue philately accepted as a distinct competitive class in its own right by the Fédération Internationale de Philatélie.

== Awards ==
Erler won awards for his displays of "The Revenue Stamps of Kurhessen (Hesse-Cassel)" at the Bangkok World Philatelic Exhibition and "The Revenue Stamps of the Austro-Hungarian Military Border" at Australia 99.

== Catalogue of the Adhesive Revenue Stamps of Germany ==
All co-authored with John Norton except where indicated. Most recent edition shown.

- Vol. I – Deutsches Reich. 4th edition. Icking, Germany: ORA-Verlag, 1998.
- Vol. II – German Colonies & Overseas Steamship Lines. 5th edition. Icking, Germany: ORA-Verlag, 1998.
- Vol. III – Old German States to 1945: Anhalt to Kurhessen. 2nd edition. Icking, Germany: ORA-Verlag, 1991.
- Vol. IV – Old German States to 1945: Lippe to Wurttemberg. 2nd edition. Icking, Germany: ORA-Verlag, 1992.
- Vol. V – Danzig, Memel, Oberschlesien. Icking, Germany: ORA-Verlag, 1995. OCLC 75585447.
- Vol. VI – Saargebiet. Icking, Germany: ORA-Verlag, 1981. OCLC 74519413
- Vol. VII – Court Fee Stamps after 1945 (1946-1973). Icking, Germany: ORA-Verlag, 1981.
- Vol. VIII – German Occupation Issues 1914-1919 / 1938-1945 & Allied Occupation Issues 1947-1951. 2nd edition. Icking, Germany: ORA-Verlag, 1996.
- Vol. IX – Fee Stamps of Bavaria Issue of 1957. Icking, Germany: ORA-Verlag, 1982. OCLC 159883370. (With Norbert Backmund)
- Vol. X – General Municipal Fee Stamps. 2nd edition. Icking, Germany: ORA-Verlag, 2000.
- Vol. XI – Berlin. 1st edition. Icking, Germany: ORA-Verlag, 1990.
- Vol. XII – SBZ/DDR. Icking, Germany: ORA-Verlag, 1993. OCLC 75359334 (Not with Norton)
- Vol. XIII – Municipal Revenue Stamps of the Saargebiet. Icking, Germany: ORA-Verlag, 1992. OCLC 312924219 (With Gerry Abrams & John Norton)
- Vol. XIV –Social Security Stamps: LVA Provincial Issues. Icking, Germany: ORA-Verlag, 1994. OCLC 312924263. (Not with Norton)
- Vol. XV – Social Security Stamps: Issues from 1.1.1923 On. Icking, Germany: ORA-Verlag, 1994. OCLC 312924284. (Not with Norton)
- Vol. XVI – Social Security Stamps: Saargebeit.
- Vol. XVII – Freight Stamps, Newspaper Parcel Stamps, Seat Reservation Stamps, Tax Substitute Stamps. Icking, Germany: ORA-Verlag, 1999. (With Fritz Junke)
- Vol. XVIII – Municipal Fee Stamps. 1999. (Multiple parts)

== Selected other publications ==
Erler also produced a number of other books on subjects covered nowhere else:

- The Adhesive Revenue Stamps of the Kingdom of Serbia, Icking, Germany: ORA-Verlag, 1992.
- Adhesive Revenue stamps of Stuttgart, 1983.
- Austria-Hungary Military Border: Catalogue of the Adhesive Revenue Stamps, Icking, Germany: ORA-Verlag, 1978.
- Bavarian Revenue Stamped Paper, Icking, Germany: 1988.
- Catalog of the old Bavarian railroad and revenue stamps, 1870-1924, Bavaria Study Group, 1986. OCLC 16923651
- Czechoslovakia Revenue and Railway Stamps, 1976. (With Gottsmich)
- Federal Republic Xmas Seals, 1993.
- Jugoslavian revenues, Yugoslavia, 1977.
- Kurhessen, 1992.
- Liechtenstein: Catalogue of the Adhesive Revenue Stamps. Icking, Germany: ORA-Verlag, 1981. OCLC 75052675
- Mecklenburg-Schwerin Stamped Paper, 1990.
- Revenue Stamped Paper of Prussia, Icking, Germany: 1988.
- Revenue Stamps of the British Occupation of Italian Colonies, 1980.
- The Adhesive Revenue Stamps of the Kingdom of Serbia, Icking, Germany: ORA-Verlag, 1992.
- The Stamps of the NSDAP (Nazi Party) and its Sub-Organisations. Icking, Germany: ORA-Verlag, 1995.
- The revenue stamped papers of the Kingdom of Westphalia: 1807-1813. Icking, Germany: ORA-Verlag, 1997. OCLC 75901649
- The Revenue Stamps of Slovakia. Icking, Germany: ORA-Verlag, 1977.
- The Würzburg revenue slips for street and bridge taxes. Icking, Germany: 1975.
