= H. E. Wright =

Hastings Elwin Wright (25 June 1861 – 30 September 1897) was an English philatelist who was one of the "Fathers of Philately" entered on the Roll of Distinguished Philatelists in 1921. He was a civil engineer by profession.

Wright joined The Philatelic Society, London, now The Royal Philatelic Society London, in 1891. He was noted by contemporaries for the superb mint condition of his stamps and The London Philatelist commented that "...the creed of immaculate condition may have been said to have been created in this country by Mr. Wright's example."

In philatelic writing, his magnum opus was his History of the Adhesive Stamps of the British Isles, which he started in 1894 with A.B. Creeke Jnr. and which was finished by Creeke when Wright died prematurely. "Wright and Creeke" subsequent became the standard work on British stamps for the next several decades.

Wright died on 30 September 1897, having suffered from influenza and a burst blood vessel in the brain. He was survived by a widow and four children.

== Selected publications ==
- A History of the Adhesive Stamps of the British Isles available for Postal and Telegraph Purposes. London: The Philatelic Society, London, 1899. (With A.B. Creeke Jnr.) (Published posthumously.) (Supplement 1903 published in parts in The London Philatelist.)
