= International Philatelic Union =

The nameplate from the I.P.U.'s official journal.

The International Philatelic Union, formed 1881, was an early international philatelic organisation formed for the study of stamps and the promotion of philately generally. Its office was located in London. The society survived to see its jubilee in 1931, and an exhibition was held to celebrate the fact, but its later history is unclear.

== Stamp exchanges ==
The Union was notable for establishing a stamp exchange section, the Amateur Collectors’ Exchange, thus originating the exchange packet system common in philatelic societies today.

== Competitions ==
On 23 February 1901 the Union held an important competitive exhibition at the premises of the Royal Philatelic Society in Effingham House, Arundel Street, London. Competitors were allowed up to fifty stamps in their entry which could be in one of five classes, 1) Great Britain or a British colony, 2) A country or colony not in class one, 3) Fiscals, 4) Envelopes and Postcards, 5) Stamps not listed in the Stanley Gibbons catalogue. The winner was Vernon Roberts for early Cape of Good Hope stamps. The catalogue for this exhibition is available in the Crawford Library, part of the British Library's Philatelic Collection.

== Fiscal Philatelic Society ==
In 1920, when the Fiscal Philatelic Society started to struggle, it came under the wing of the I.P.U. as their Fiscal and Local Stamp Section.

== Liverpool Philatelic Society ==
The L.P.S., one of the first philatelic societies in the United Kingdom, was formed on 29 November 1888 as a branch of the I.P.U.

== Membership ==
A number of distinguished philatelists, often members of the Royal Philatelic Society as well, were members of the I.P.U., including:

- Franz Reichenheim
- Vernon Roberts (Vice-President)
- James Benjamin Seymour RDP (President)
- John Kercheval Sidebottom RDP (President)
- Walter Beckton RDP & Lindenberg Medal
- George Bishop (Hon. Secretary 1885)
- Lionel Fulcher RDP (Vice-President)
- George Hamilton-Smith (Committee member)
- Herbert Oldfield RDP (President)
- Robert Berg
- Sydney Rondel

RDP = Roll of Distinguished Philatelists

== Journal ==
The official organ of the Union was The Philatelic Journal of Great Britain, published from 1891. As of 1938 the journal was also the official publication of the Manchester, City of London, Herts and Birmingham Philatelic Societies. In 1956 Robson Lowe acquired the firm of P.L. Pemberton & Co., which included the Philatelic Journal, and eventually it was incorporated into Lowe's The Philatelist.

== See also ==
- Fédération Internationale de Philatélie
