= Stanley Phillips =

British philatelist (1891–1954)

Stanley Phillips

Frederick Stanley Phillips (31 December 1891 – 29 March 1954) was a British philatelist and prolific philatelic author who signed the Roll of Distinguished Philatelists at Folkestone in 1937.

Stanley Phillips was the son of William Henry Phillips (assistant managing director of Stanley Gibbons), and the nephew of Charles James Phillips.

== Military service ==
Phillips served in the British Army during World War I including in Gallipoli, Egypt and Palestine. He was granted a commission in the King's Royal Rifle Corps.

== Career at Stanley Gibbons ==
Stanley Phillips joined Stanley Gibbons in 1906 and rose to become chairman of the firm.

Returning to the firm after the end of World War I, he was asked to create the Stanley Gibbons Monthly Circular and from 1922 he was the editor of all Stanley Gibbons publications. In 1926 he became joint managing director with William Hamilton Andrews and after Hamilton Andrews retired in 1946 Phillips became sole managing director. After his cousin Frank Phillips died in July 1953, Phillips became chairman of the company.

In 1934 he created the "Simplified" catalogue at Stanley Gibbons which has since become the key work "Stamps of the World".

== Organised philately ==
Phillips served on the council of the British Philatelic Association.

In 1933 he was awarded the Congress Cup at the Philatelic Congress of Great Britain for his paper "Philatelic Literature".

== Writing ==
Phillips has been called a "crusader for philately" and he was particularly noted for his many books on Stamp Collecting that introduced a whole generation to the hobby. His titles were usually for the beginner and always referred to stamp collecting and not philately.

== Selected publications ==
- Great Britain: the Harrison & Somerset House Printings (1911-12) and How to Distinguish Them, Stanley Gibbons Limited, 1913.
- The Stamps of Great Britain (1911-21)
- Stamp Collecting for All
- Stamp Collecting and How to Enjoy it
- Stamp Collecting
- By Air Through the Stamp Album
- The Splendid Book of Stamps
- The Beginner’s Book of Stamp Collecting
- Fascination of Stamp Collecting
- Stamp Collecting for the Million
- How to Arrange and Write up a Stamp Collection (with C.P. Rang)

And some of his numerous magazine articles:

- "Denmark Stamps for the Moderate Specialist" in Stanley Gibbons Monthly Journal, October 1926. Reproduced here.
- "The First Issue of the Yemen" in Gibbons Stamp Monthly, July 1932. Reproduced here.
