= Fiscal Philatelic Society =

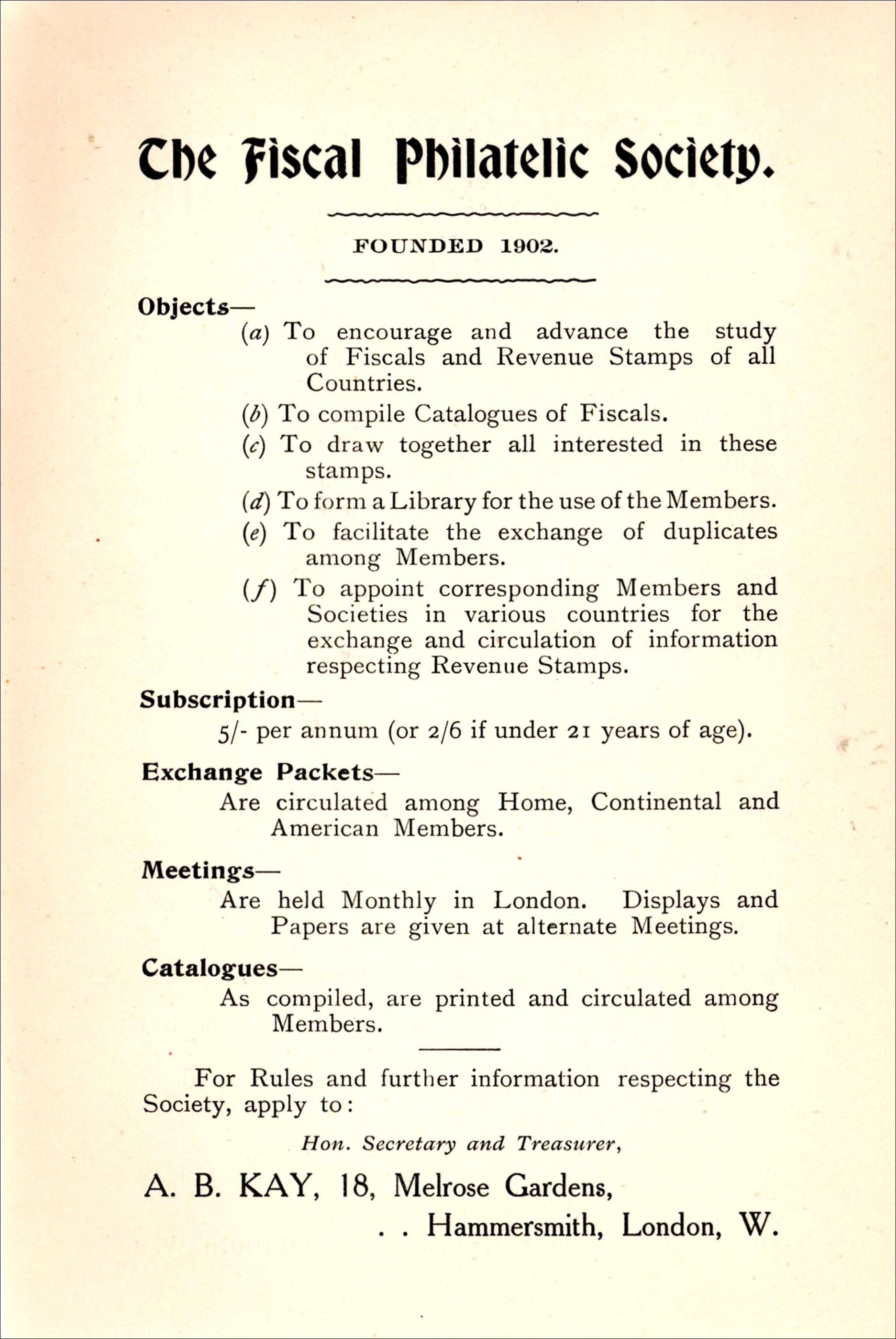
An advert for the society from a 1908 catalogue

The Fiscal Philatelic Society (11 January 1902 – 1928) was an early twentieth-century British philatelic society that is seen as a predecessor to today's The Revenue Society. The principal object of the society was the study of fiscal stamps, or, as they are more usually called today, revenue stamps.

== Objects ==
The objects of the society were:

(a) To encourage and advance the study of Fiscals and Revenue Stamps of all Countries.
(b) To compile Catalogues of Fiscals.
(c) To draw together all interested in these stamps.
(d) To form a Library for the use of the Members.
(e) To facilitate the exchange of duplicates among members.
(f) To appoint corresponding Members and Societies in various countries for the exchange and circulation of information respecting Revenue Stamps.

In 1911 the objects of the society were extended to include local stamps and railway stamps.

== Activities and history ==
The society was instrumental in collating information about the latest revenue stamps, which was published in their journal The Bulletin.

From 1 January 1920 the society became the Fiscal and Local Stamp Section of the International Philatelic Union.

By 1928 the society had ceased to exist, possibly reflecting a declining interest in revenue stamps that started around the end of the First World War and continued until a revival that started in the 1970s. By then the society had been replaced by The Cinderella Stamp Club and, later, The Revenue Society.

== Membership ==
Although small, the society was notable for its distinguished membership which included many of the most prominent names in British philately in the first decades of the twentieth century and shows a high correlation with Schofield's Who Was Who in British Philately and a significant number of signatories to the Roll of Distinguished Philatelists. Members included, among others:

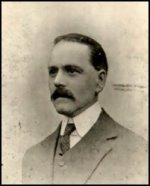
Walter Morley

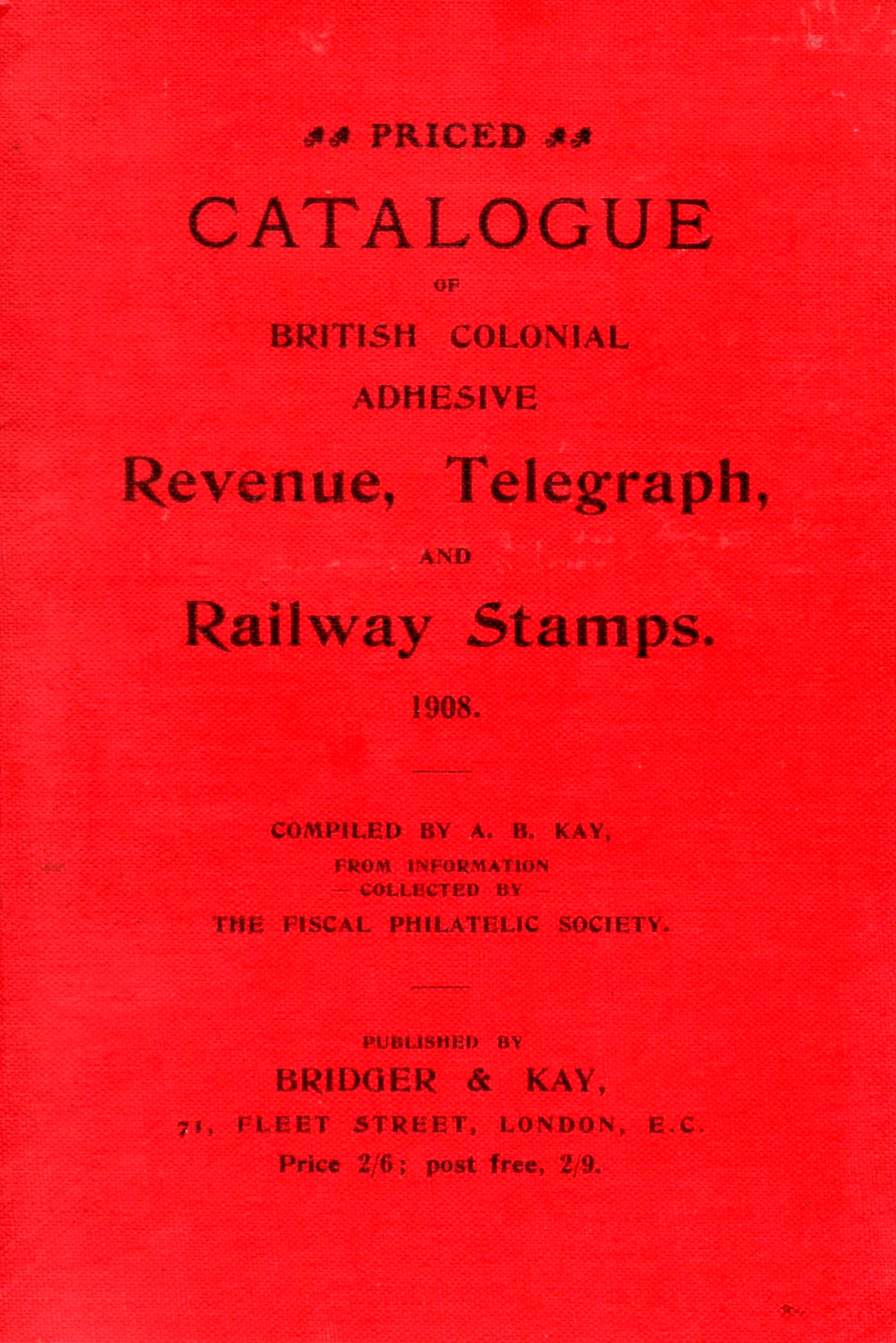
A 1908 catalogue by A.B. Kay published by Bridger & Kay from information collected by the F.P.S.

- Thomas Allen
- E.D. Bacon RDP
- Maj. K.M. Beaumont RDP
- Walter Beckton RDP
- Louis Bradbury RDP
- William Wilmot Corfield (India)
- C.S.F. Crofton (India)
- Alfred Forbin
- Lionel Fulcher RDP
- Frank Godden RDP
- William F. Hadlow RDP
- Thomas William Hall RDP
- H.F. Johnson
- A.B. Kay (co-founder of Bridger & Kay)
- Dr. J.A. Legrand RDP
- Oswald Marsh
- Fred Melville RDP
- Jean-Baptiste Moens
- Walter Morley
- Charles Nissen RDP
- Herbert Rooke Oldfield RDP
- Percival Loines Pemberton RDP
- Judge Frederick Philbrick RDP
- Alexander Joseph Sefi RDP
- James Benjamin Seymour RDP
- John Stanley Telfer RDP
- Arthur John Warren RDP
- Robert Blake Yardley RDP

RDP = Roll of Distinguished Philatelists

== Publications ==
- The Bulletin of the Fiscal Philatelic Society, Vols. I & II. (Reprinted in one volume by the Cinderella Stamp Club, London, 1980)
- May, O. Egyptian interpostals or official local stamps. Published for the Fiscal Philatelic Society by Bridger & Kay, 1915.
- Various catalogues of revenue stamps.
