= Théodore Champion =

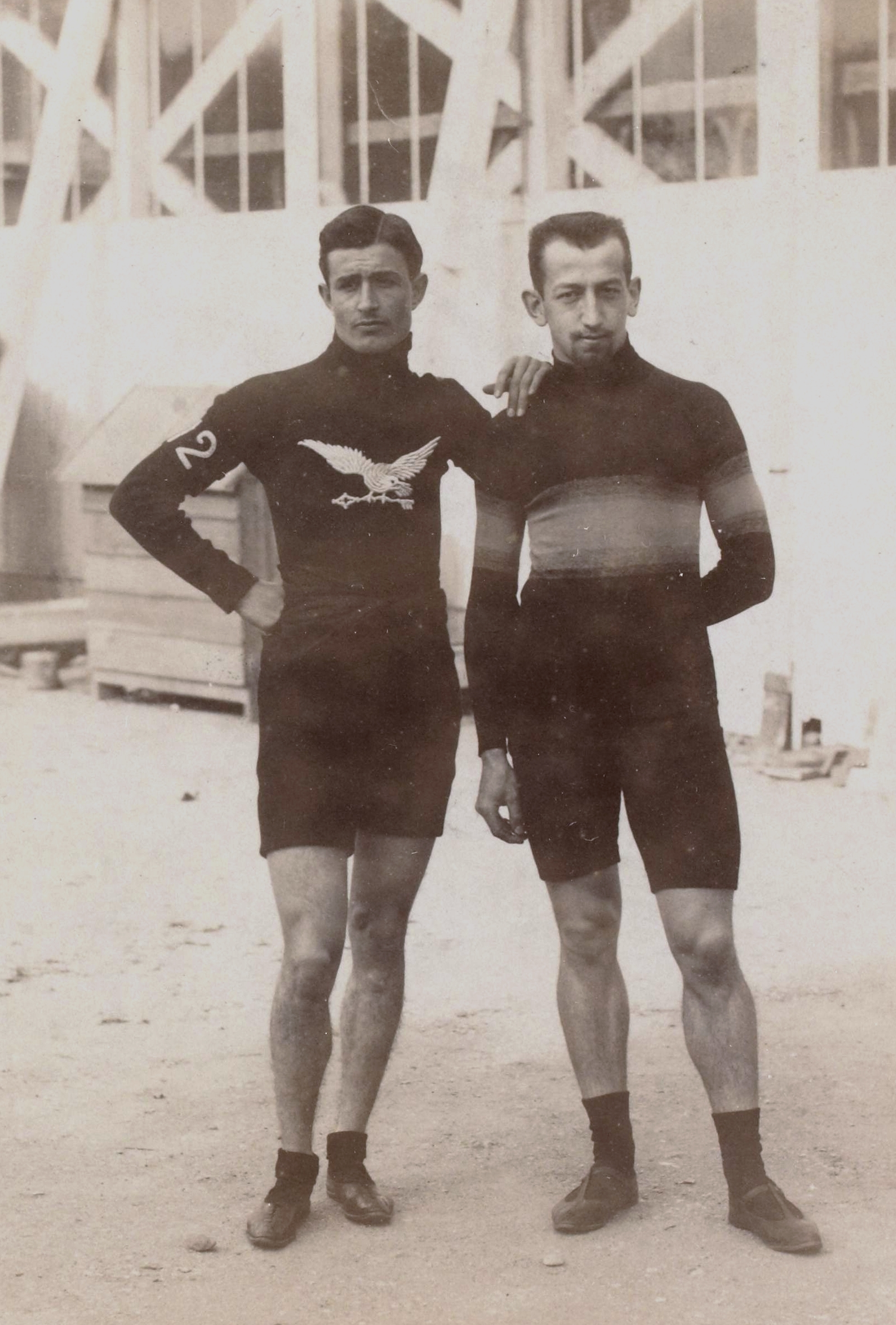
Théodore Champion with Henri Henneberg in Paris–Roubaix (1898)

Théodore Champion (14 February 1873 – 31 August 1954) was a Swiss cyclist, philatelist and stamp dealer, who was added to the Roll of Distinguished Philatelists in 1937. He was born in Geneva and took French citizenship in 1948.

== Cycling ==
Théodore Champion was among the first generation of Swiss cyclists. Four times - 1892, 1893, 1895 and 1896 - he was Swiss champion in the sprint. In 1895 he was also second in the Swiss Championship road race.

== Philately ==
Theodore Champion was the son of a bank employee and a mother who collected stamps. With his brother Adrien he searched the bins of his father's bank for stamps. It was said that they sold their collection for a large sum of money to show their skeptical father the merits of collecting stamps.

He moved to Paris in 1899 and was employed by Alfred Forbin. In 1902 he bought Forbin's postage stamp dealership so that Forbin could concentrate on fiscal stamps.

Champion was one of the founders of the Paris Postal Museum, to which he left valuable pieces from his collection.

== Tributes ==
Theodore Champion was shown several times on stamps:

- Liechtenstein issued a special stamp in 1969
- Antigua 1993
- Montserrat in 2002 on a block of four stamps in honor of Rowland Hill
