= W. A. S. Westoby =

British philatelist (1815–1899)

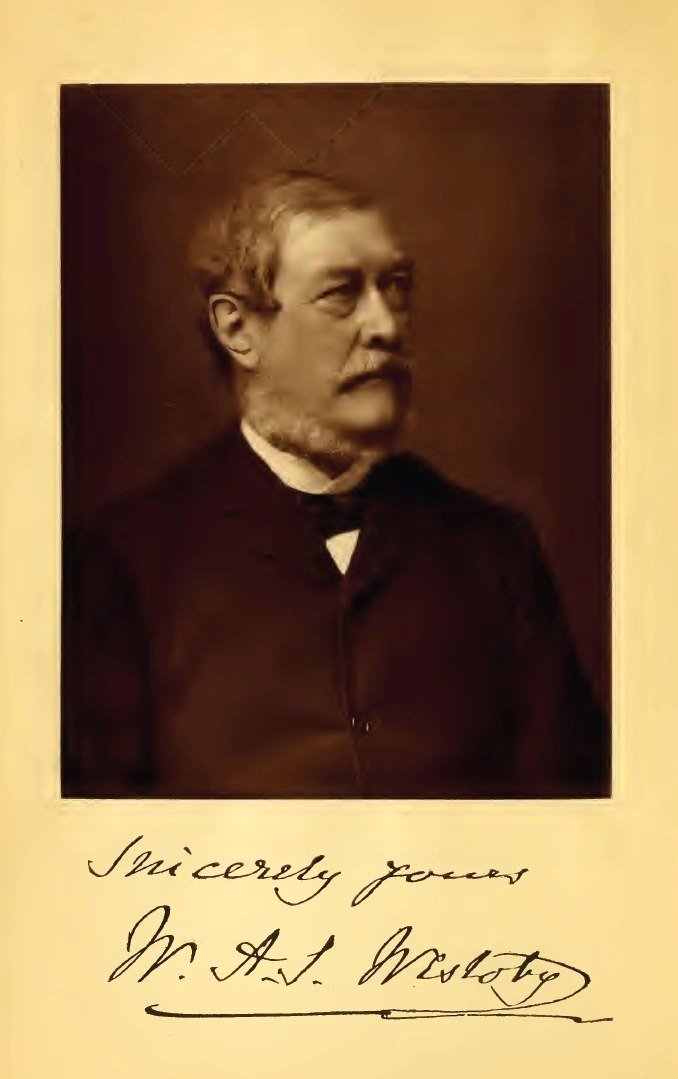
W.A.S. Westoby and signature as pictured in The Philatelic Record, 1883.

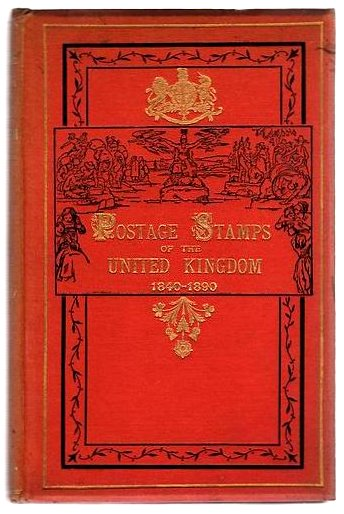
The cover of Westoby's 1891 Penny Postage Jubilee.

William Amos Scarborough Westoby M.A. (1815–1899) was an English philatelist who was one of the "Fathers of Philately" entered on the Roll of Distinguished Philatelists in 1921. His obituary in The London Philatelist stated that he had "...fairly earned the title of the Grand Seigneur of Philately." By profession, Westoby was a barrister of Lincoln's Inn.

== Early life ==
Westoby was born in 1815 at Emberton, Buckinghamshire, the son of Amos Westoby who had graduated from St Edmund Hall, Oxford and been ordained the previous year; his mother Mary (née Swannell) died in 1818. He received his M.A. in 1839 from Trinity College, Cambridge.

== Philately ==
Westoby began collecting stamps in 1861 or 1862. He was resident in Paris for some time where he met his lifelong friend Frederick Philbrick in 1863. He discovered the first known copy of the Spanish 2r 1851 error of colour in 1867. He was not a founder of The Philatelic Society, London, now The Royal Philatelic Society London, but was a member from at least November 1869, shortly after the Society's founding, when he read a paper titled "Envelopes of Germany". At one point he resigned and was later re-elected, possibly because membership of the society was at one time limited to residents of London.

Westoby was a prolific contributor to philatelic journals under the pen name "A Parisian Collector", including The Philatelist and The Stamp-Collector's Magazine. He was the editor for four years of The Philatelic Record and also of Alfred Smith & Co.'s Monthly Circular from 1878. When his European collection was dispersed, many fine items found their way into the Tapling Collection.

== Selected philatelic publications ==
- The Postage and Telegraph Stamps of Great Britain. London: The Philatelic Society, London & Sampson Low, Marston, Searle and Rivington, 1881. (With F.A. Philbrick)
- Penny Postage Jubilee: a descriptive catalogue of all postage stamps of the United Kingdom of Great Britain and Ireland issued during fifty years. London: Sampson Low, 1891.
- The Adhesive Postage Stamps of Europe: a practical guide to their collection, identification, and classification ... Volume 1: Alsace and Lorraine - Ionian Islands. London: L. Upcott Gill, 1898.
- The Adhesive Postage Stamps of Europe: a practical guide to their collection, identification, and classification ... Volume 2: Italy - Wurtenburg. London: L. Upcott Gill, 1900.

== Legal works ==
Westoby was a barrister of Lincoln's Inn and wrote a number of legal books including guides to the laws of Belgium and France for foreigners resident there and a guide to the Wills of British subjects made abroad.

== Personal life ==
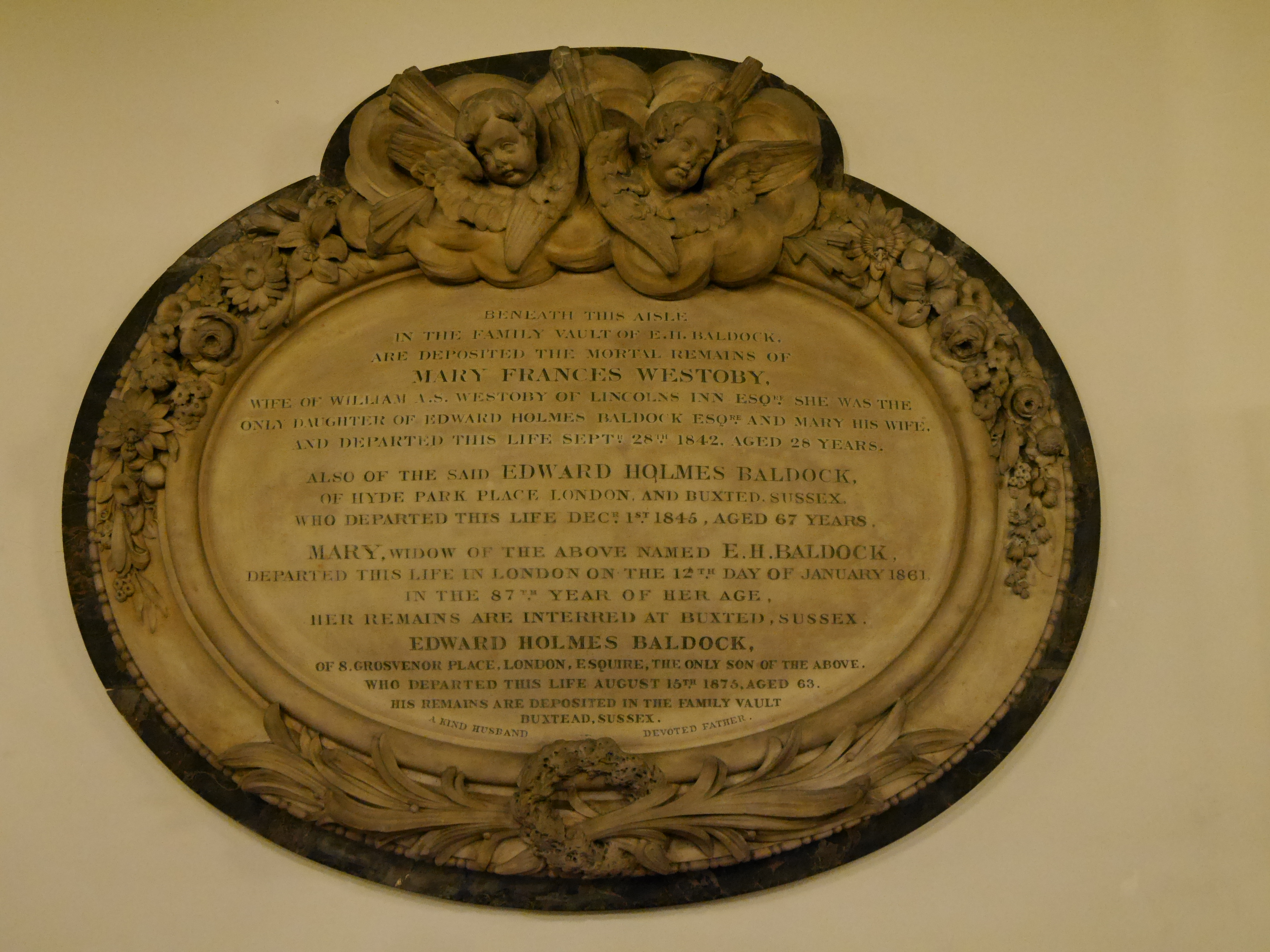
Memorial to his wife, St Pancras New Church, London

Westoby was married, firstly, in 1841, to Mary Frances Baldock, the only daughter of Edward Holmes Baldock, the prominent London dealer in French 18th-century furniture and reproductions. She died in 1842, aged 28. He married, secondly, in 1849, Lucy Acriss or Aycriss Studley, only child of William Studley of Kennington.
