= Herbert Edgar Weston =

- Born: October 28, 1874; Chichester, England
- Died: November 21, 1961 (aged 87); Twickenham, England
- Occupation: Stamp dealer

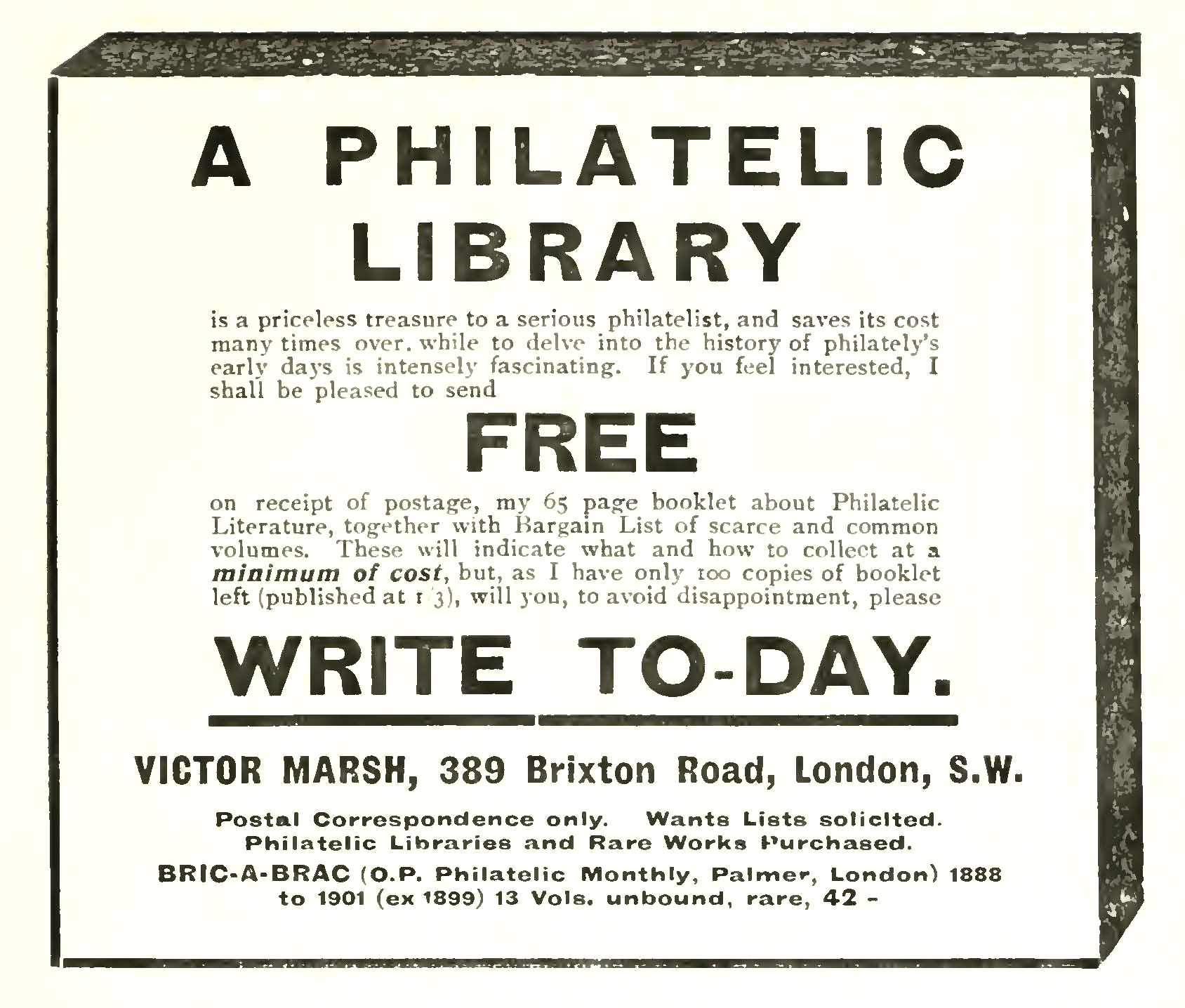
A 1906 advert for Weston from The Philatelic Index, 1906.

Herbert Edgar Weston (28 October 1874 in Chichester – 21 November 1961 in Twickenham), or H. Edgar Weston, was a stamp dealer in Stockwell, London, then Twickenham, who used the pseudonym Victor Marsh and who purchased Jean-Baptiste Moens' stock of philatelic literature after Moens' retirement in about 1907. Weston claimed to have the world's largest stock of philatelic literature for sale. He was also a prolific producer of philatelic covers using cut-outs from stamped to order postal stationery items. In 1907, Weston was a founder member of the Philatelic Literature Society.

== Cut-outs ==
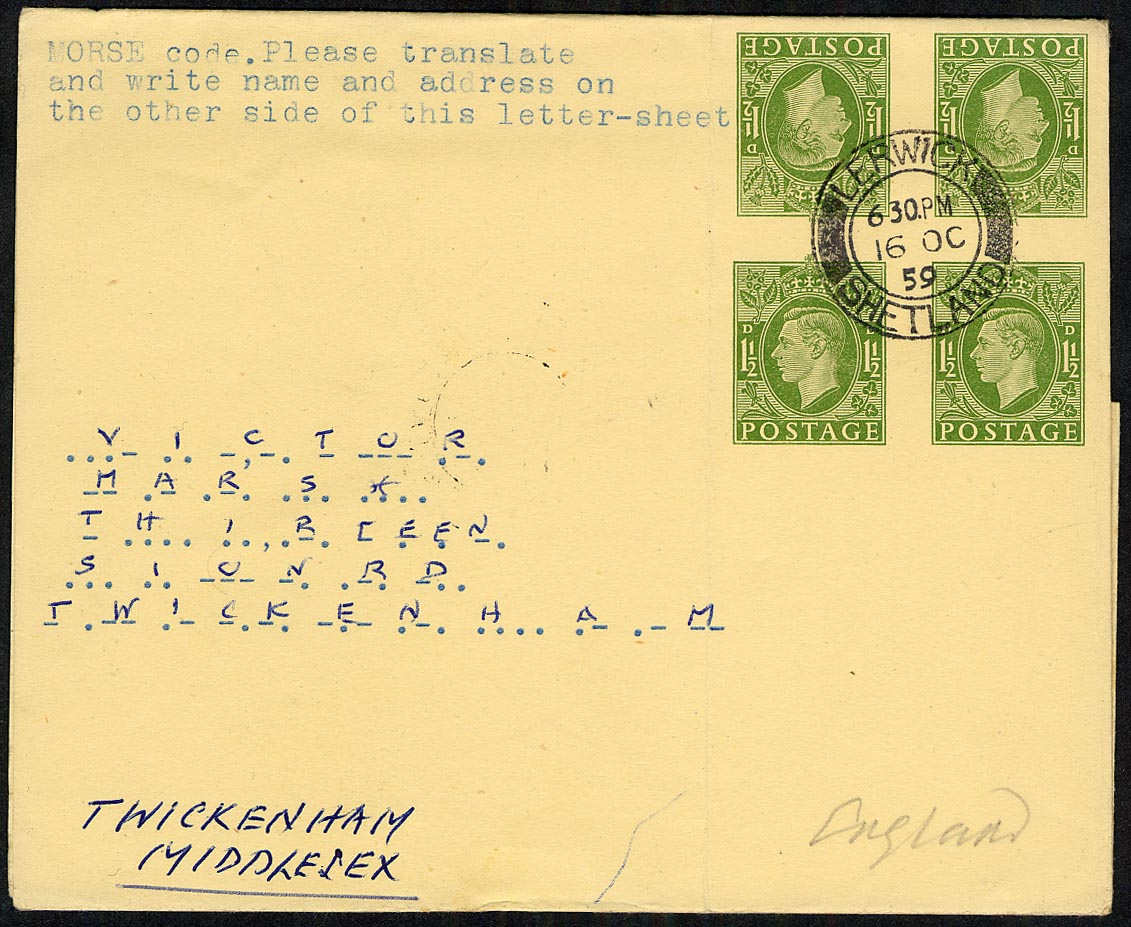
Folded sheet with four impressions, tête-bêche, of KGVI 1½d, postmarked Lerwick on 16 October 1959, addressed to Victor Marsh.

In his book Abnormal Embossed Postage Stamps of King Edward VII and King George V Weston writes that on numerous occasions he received envelopes franked with cut-outs and in 1909 he had the idea of several different stamps being embossed together. He enquired of the Inspector of Stamping and much to his surprise discovered that his request could be complied with. So he embarked on ordering multiple embossing of stamps on sheets and then cutting them up into pairs and other multiples and using them on envelopes. From 1910 to 1915 he placed twelve orders which were supplied to him. Then the order he placed in May 1916 was refused, the Post Office stated that they had "decided to discontinue that particular form of stamping". Weston was not the only philatelist who created philatelic covers using cut-outs, but he appears to be the only one who took the initiative to order stamped to order embossed stamps on sheets and produce covers using cut-outs from these sheets.

Weston was not shy in seeking co-operation in the creation of items he could sell, sending packets of covers franked with cut-outs to serving British army officers during World War One, and over an extended period to the post office at Tristan da Cunha, with requests that they be posted back, suitably cancelled.

In the 1950s Weston again managed to persuade the Post Office to produce tête-bêche multiple letterpress impressions with King George VI and Queen Elizabeth II dies. Examples of these items are known used during the period 1956 to 1959.

== Career ==
Weston is known to have been in Stockwell from at least 1906 to about 1930. During this period covers are known addressed to him at 386 Brixton Road, London SW9, and advertising shows his address as 389 Brixton Road. From 1935, till his death in 1961, he is known to have been in Twickenham; numerous covers exist addressed to him or to his trading name Victor Marsh at 13 Sion Road, Twickenham, Middlesex. A cover is known addressed to Weston from Stampex 1956 and franked with cut-outs and an advert for cut-outs appeared in the Stamp Collectors' Annual 1958, despite what must have been a rapidly declining market for such items.

His stock or library were sold by Glendining in 1924.

== Death ==
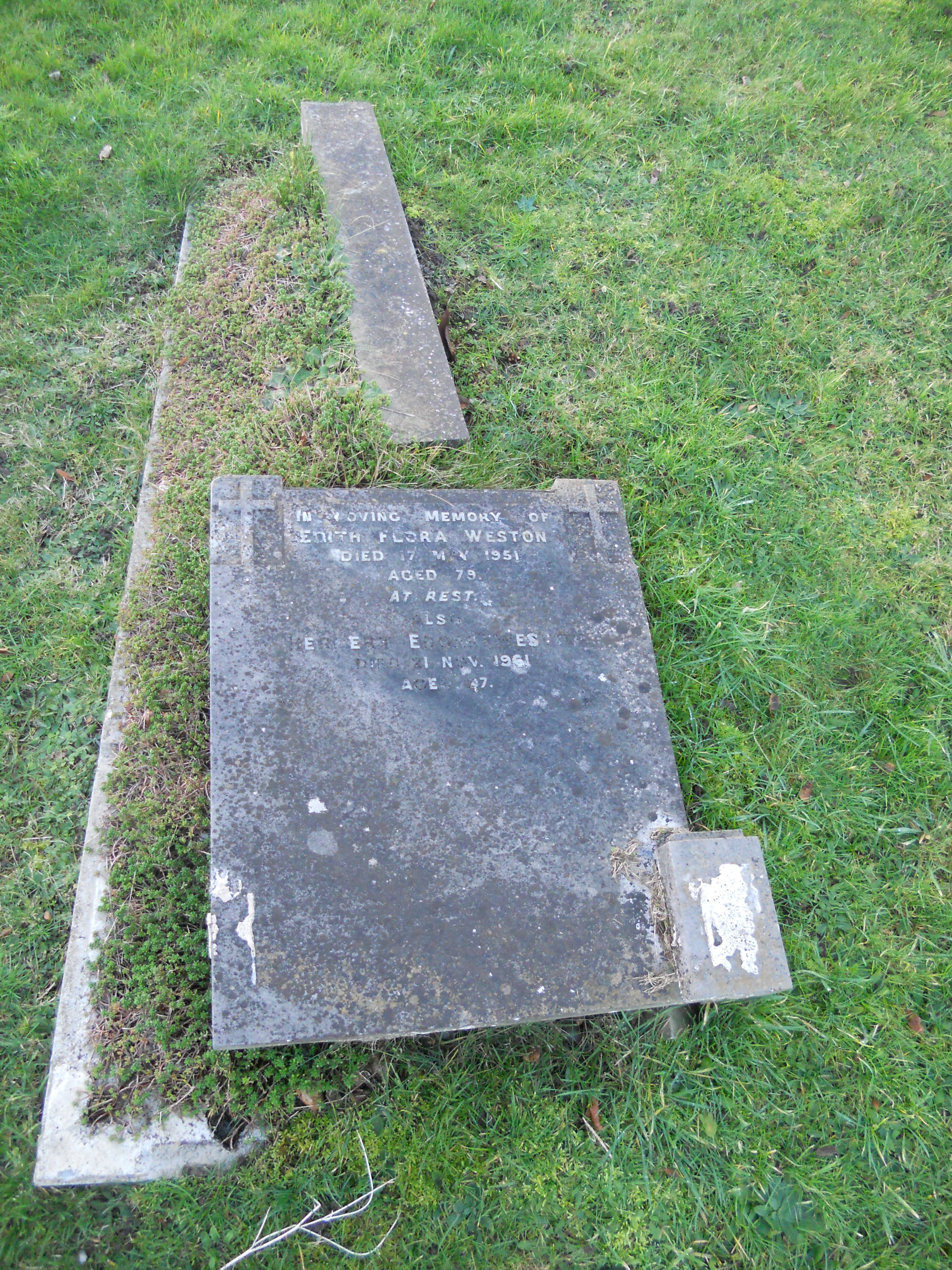
Grave of Weston and his wife in Twickenham Cemetery in 2014

Weston died on 21 November 1961 and was buried in Twickenham Cemetery on 27 November 1961 alongside his wife. His wife, Edith Flora, died on 17 May 1951. He was not related to Oswald Marsh, a contemporary in Norwood, London.

== Publications ==
- International Directory of Philatelic Literature, Collectors, Dealers, and Publishers, 1904.
- A British Georgian Stamp Banned by the Postmaster General!, 1920. (pamphlet)
- Great Britain – Abnormal Embossed Postage Stamps of King Edward VII and King George V, Harris Publications, London, 1923.
