= Alfred Forbin =

French stamp dealer (1872–1956)

Alfred J. Forbin
- Born: February 13, 1872; Paris, France
- Died: August 14, 1956 (aged 84)
- Occupation: Stamp dealer

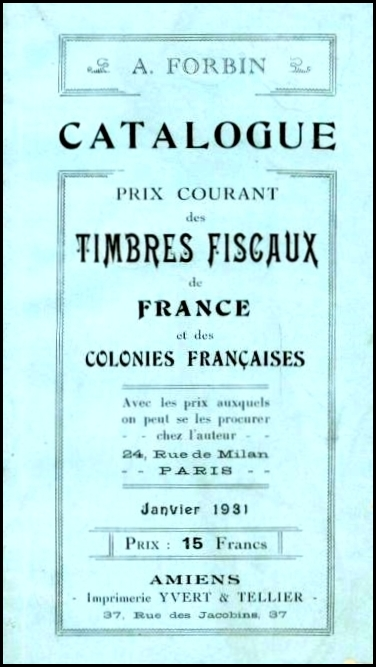
The cover of a 1931 catalogue by Forbin.

Alfred J. Forbin (13 February 1872 – 14 August 1956) was a pioneering French stamp dealer who wrote an all-world catalogue of revenue stamps that has never been surpassed.

== Early life ==
Alfred Forbin was born in Paris on 13 February 1872.

== Stamp dealing ==
Forbin started as a stamp dealer in 1890 and in 1900 he opened a shop in the Rue Drouot in Paris Later he was at 24 Rue de Milan, 80 Rue Saint-Lazare and 35 Rue de Berne.

In 1902, Théodore Champion, his employee and the best man at his wedding, purchased the business from Forbin who afterwards concentrated on fiscal stamps. In 1905 Forbin acquired the fiscal stamp collection of Dr. Legrand.

== Catalogues ==
Forbin's Catalogue de Timbres-Fiscaux was the most comprehensive all-world catalogue of revenue stamps produced up to that time and is still regularly referred to by revenue philatelists as no other all-world catalogue has been prepared since Forbin's third edition in 1915. Forbin also started a journal Le Bulletin Fiscaliste in order to keep the catalogue up to date.

== Organised philately ==
Forbin was a member, from October 1904, of the Fiscal Philatelic Society and served on the committee from 1912 to 1916.

He was one of the founders and the Doyon (Dean) of the stamp dealer's organisation the Chambre Syndicale Francaise de la Philatelie.

== Later life ==
Letters in the National Archives of Australia show Forbin requesting revenue stamps from the Australian authorities over the period 1925 to 1947 and it seems likely that he would have been in contact with other governments as well. And correspondence reproduced in The Revenue Journal, shows that Forbin was still dealing in fiscal stamps as late as August 1955.

== Death ==
Alfred J. Forbin died on 14 August 1956 after suffering from ill-health for many years. He received obituaries in The American Revenuer and L'Echangiste Universelle.

== Selected publications ==
Forbin's catalogues served the original purpose of stamp catalogues in being retail price lists first and works of reference second. All are in the French language:

- Timbres rares, Forbin, Paris, 1895. (A price list)
- Prix-courant de timbres, cartes, enveloppes et bandes postales de A. Forbin, 1898.
- Prix-courant de timbres, cartes, enveloppes et bandes postales de A. Forbin et Co, 4th edition, 1900.
- Catalogue prix-courant de timbres-poste / Catalogue general de timbres-poste, Yvert & Tellier, Amiens, 1902.
- Catalogue de Timbres-Fiscaux, Yvert & Tellier, Amiens. Three editions, 1905, 1909 and 1915. (Third edition reprinted 1980 and 1991)
- Catalogue Prix Courant de tous les Timbre Fiscaux emis dans le monde entier, c.1910.
- Catalogue entente cordiale Colonies Francaises & Anglaises / Prix courant de timbres-poste des Colonies Anglaises et Francaises, Forbin, Paris, 1912.
- Catalogue des Timbres Fiscaux de France et Colonies. Three editions, 1925, 1931 and 1937.
- Les Timbres Fiscaux d'Allemagne Part 1 Timbres jusqu'en 1939, 1955.
