= Turner Collection of Railway Letter Stamps =

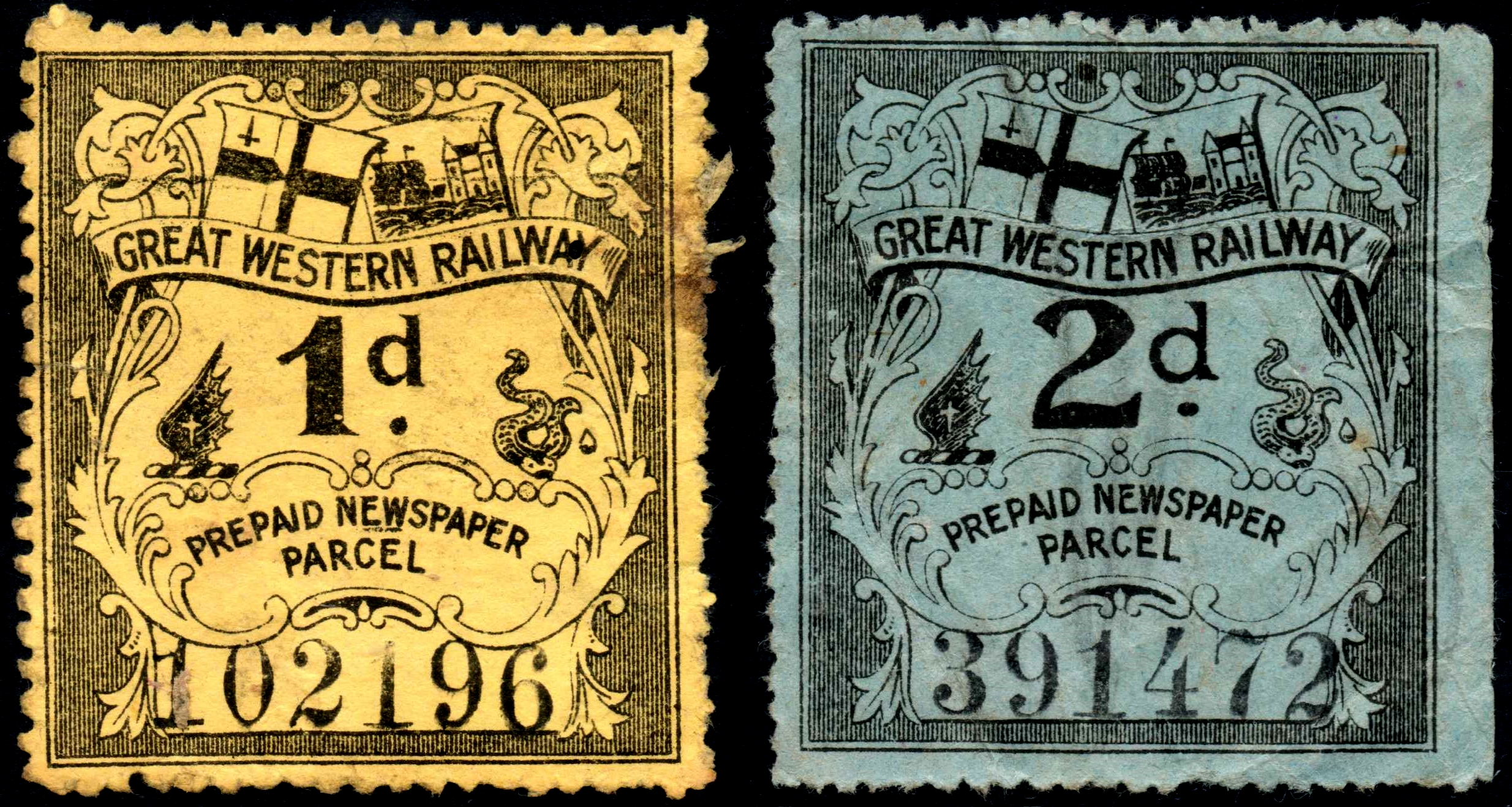
British Great Western Railway newspaper parcel stamps (not from the Turner Collection).

The Turner Collection of Railway Letter Stamps is a collection of railway letter stamps of the United Kingdom from 1891 to the mid-1940s that forms part of the British Library Philatelic Collections. It was formed by S. R. Turner and donated in 1973.

== See also ==
- Ewen Collection
- Parcel stamp
