= Herbert Oldfield =

British philatelist and solicitor

Herbert Rooke Oldfield
- Born: 1850
- Died: 22 December 1940 (aged 80–81)
- Occupation: Philatelist

Herbert Rooke Oldfield (1859 – 22 December 1940) was a British solicitor and philatelist who signed the Roll of Distinguished Philatelists in 1922.

Oldfield was president of the International Philatelic Union and honorary secretary, 1895, of the Society for the Suppression of Speculative Issues. He collected India, Bolivia, Bosnia, Chinese locals and Formosa, Colombia, Persia, and Swiss Cantonals.
