= Le Timbre-Poste =

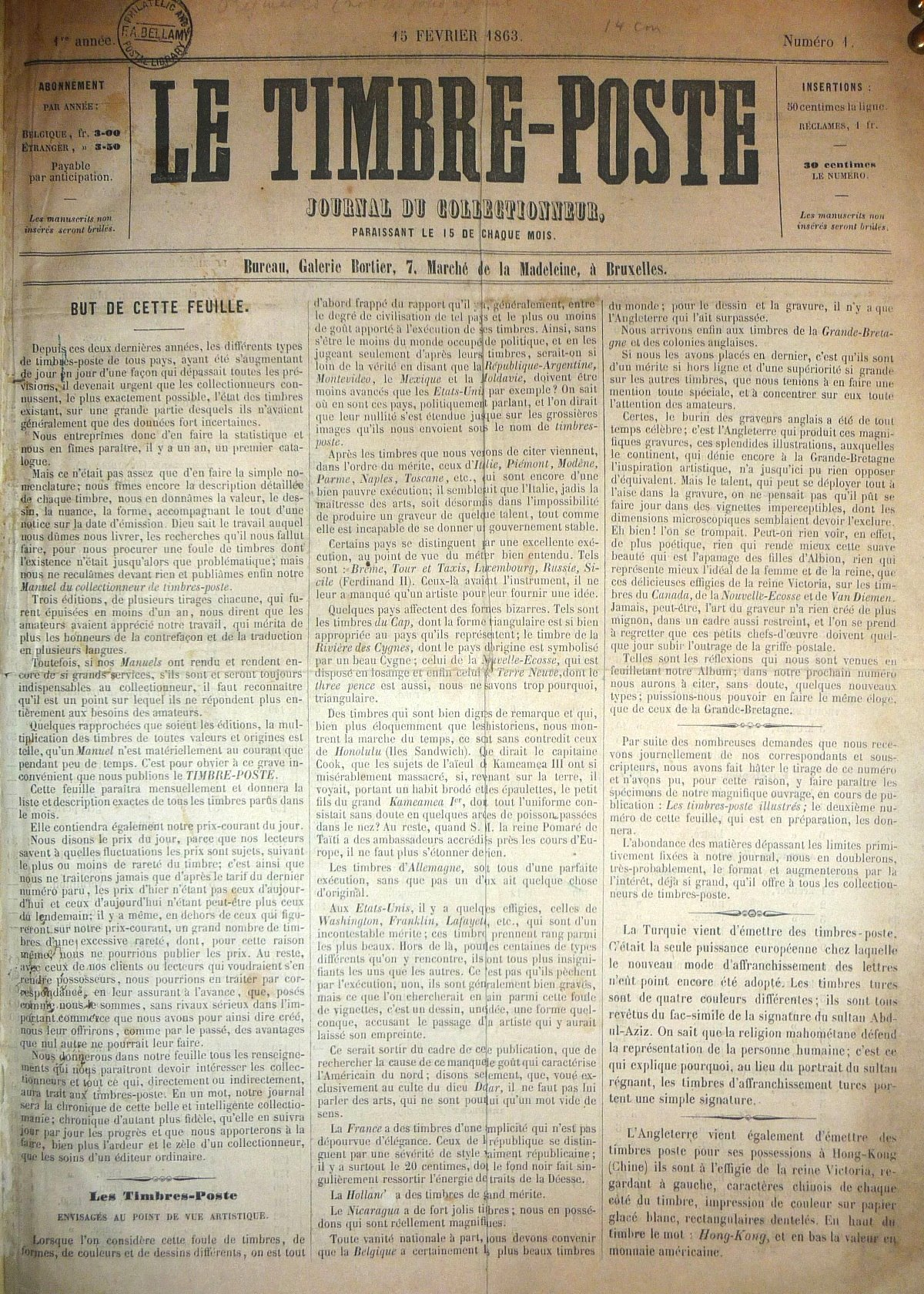
The first edition of Le Timbre-Poste, 15 February 1863.

Le Timbre-Poste was the first French language philatelic magazine. It was published by Jean-Baptiste Moens of Brussels from 1863 to 1900. Le Timbre Fiscal was included as a supplement from volume 17 of 1879 and incorporated from January 1897, when the whole was renamed Le Timbre-Poste et Le Timbre Fiscal. After Moens retired in 1900, it was discovered that his brother-in-law Louis Hanciau had actually been responsible for most of the literary content of Le Timbre-Poste.
