= Arthur Maury =

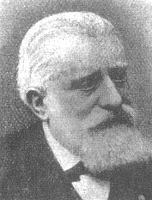
- An old photo of Arthur Maury (1844-1907), one of original stamp dealers and a renowned philatelic writer
- Born: 31 July 1844; Paris, France
- Died: 1 December 1907 (aged 63); France
- Occupation: Philatelist

Arthur Maury (French pronunciation: [aʁtyʁ moʁi]; Paris, 31 July 1844 – 1 December 1907) was a philatelist who was one of the "Fathers of Philately" entered on the Roll of Distinguished Philatelists in 1921.
