= John K. Sidebottom =

British philatelist

John Kercheval Sidebottom
- Born: 1880
- Died: 1954 (aged 73–74)

John Kercheval Sidebottom OBE (1880–1954) was a British philatelist who signed the Roll of Distinguished Philatelists in 1949.

== Selected publications ==
- The Post by Road
- History of Mileage Marks
- Additional Halfpenny Tax
- The Overland Mail (1948) (based on his collection of Thomas Waghorn covers)
- The Government Dockwra (1951)
