= Louis Hanciau =

Belgian philatelist

Louis Francois Hanciau (9 April 1835 – 11 November 1924) was a Belgian philatelist who signed the Roll of Distinguished Philatelists in 1921.

== Early collecting ==
In "Old-time Memories" in Stanley Gibbons Monthly Journal of 1906, Hanciau tells how he started to collect stamps in 1852, aged seventeen, after seeing the collection of Pierre Maus, who had not more than fifty different stamps. Hanciau had a great deal of difficulty finding stamps to add to his collection. Many people thought him "cracked", and many letters bore no stamps. He often negotiated with postmen to buy stamps they had torn from letters, and so many customers complained about the damage that the practice eventually became an offence punishable by dismissal. There were no stamp dealers at first, and the earliest dealers, like Jean-Baptiste Moens, traded in stamps only as a sideline. On the other hand, few people knew anything about stamps, and Hanciau was often able to obtain great rarities at very little cost.

== Philatelic writing ==
Hanciau was the author of much of the literary output of Jean-Baptiste Moens, his brother-in-law. After Moens retired in 1900, Hanciau wrote for Stanley Gibbons Monthly Journal, initially under his reversed initials, H.L.F. (September 1901) or H.L.F. (November 1900), but from 1903 he wrote under his own name.

He was awarded the Lindenberg Medal in 1906.
