= Herbert L'Estrange Ewen =

British stamp dealer and philatelist (1876–1912)

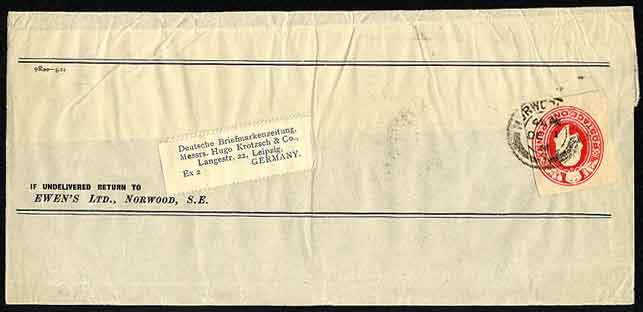
A newspaper wrapper stamped with a cut-out and sent out in 1911 from the Ewen's company to Germany

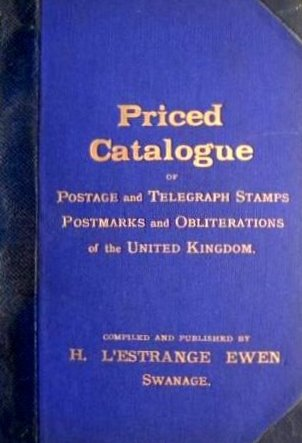
The cover of an 1895 work by L'Estrange Ewen (fourth edition).

Herbert L'Estrange Ewen (1876–1912) was a British stamp dealer and philatelist in Swanage, Dorset and later in Norwood, London who was an authority on railway stamps. According to Brian Birch, Ewen collected stamps at the age of ten and started his own firm, the H. L’Estrange Ewen company, on his thirteenth birthday.

== Esperanto ==
Herbert L'Estrange Ewen was a very early adept of Dr L.L. Zamenhof's auxiliary language Esperanto. He is listed as number 2920 in the 'Adresaro de la personoj kiuj ellernis la lingvon "Esperanto"/Serio XV' which lists those who learned the language in the period from 13 July to 13 October 1893.

== Philately ==
Ewen was the publisher of the monthly English Specialists' Journal which ran from 1895 to 1897 and of Ewen’s Weekly Stamp News (EWSN) from 1899. In 1914 the Evening News revealed that Ewen was selling German stamps overprinted Belgien and accused him of trading with the enemy. Trading with Germany and its allies had been illegal in Britain since the beginning of World War I under the Trading with the Enemy Act 1914. Ewen replied in EWSN for 30 January 1915 that the stamps had been brought to England by two Belgian soldiers as their only asset and they had obtained them from a German official in Brussels. Official approval for the sale had been obtained British Home Office.

In 1949 his collection of railway letter stamps for the period 1891 to 1912 with sheets, proofs, and covers was given to the British Museum by his sister Mrs Clement Williams and is now in the British Library Philatelic Collections as the Ewen Collection.

== Selected publications ==
- Standard Catalogue of British Stamps and Postmarks, 1st edition, 1893.
- A Complete Priced Catalogue of the Postal and Telegraph Adhesives of Great Britain with Walter Morley and Harry Hilckes: Hilckes, Kirkpatrick & Co., London, c. 1894.
- Standard Priced Catalogue of the Stamps and Postmarks of the United Kingdom, 1898.
- Reference List of Railway Letter Post Stamps, 1901.
- History of Railway Letter Stamps, 1901.
- Priced Catalogue of Railway Letter Stamps, 1903.
- Priced Catalogue of the Unadhesive Postage Stamps of the United Kingdom (1840–1905), Ewen's Colonial Stamp Market, London, 1905.
- Railway Newspaper and Parcel Stamps of the United Kingdom, Ewen's Colonial Stamp Market Ltd., 1906. (Reprint, 1983 by Tim Clutterbuck & Co.)
