= Edward Holmes Baldock =

British politician

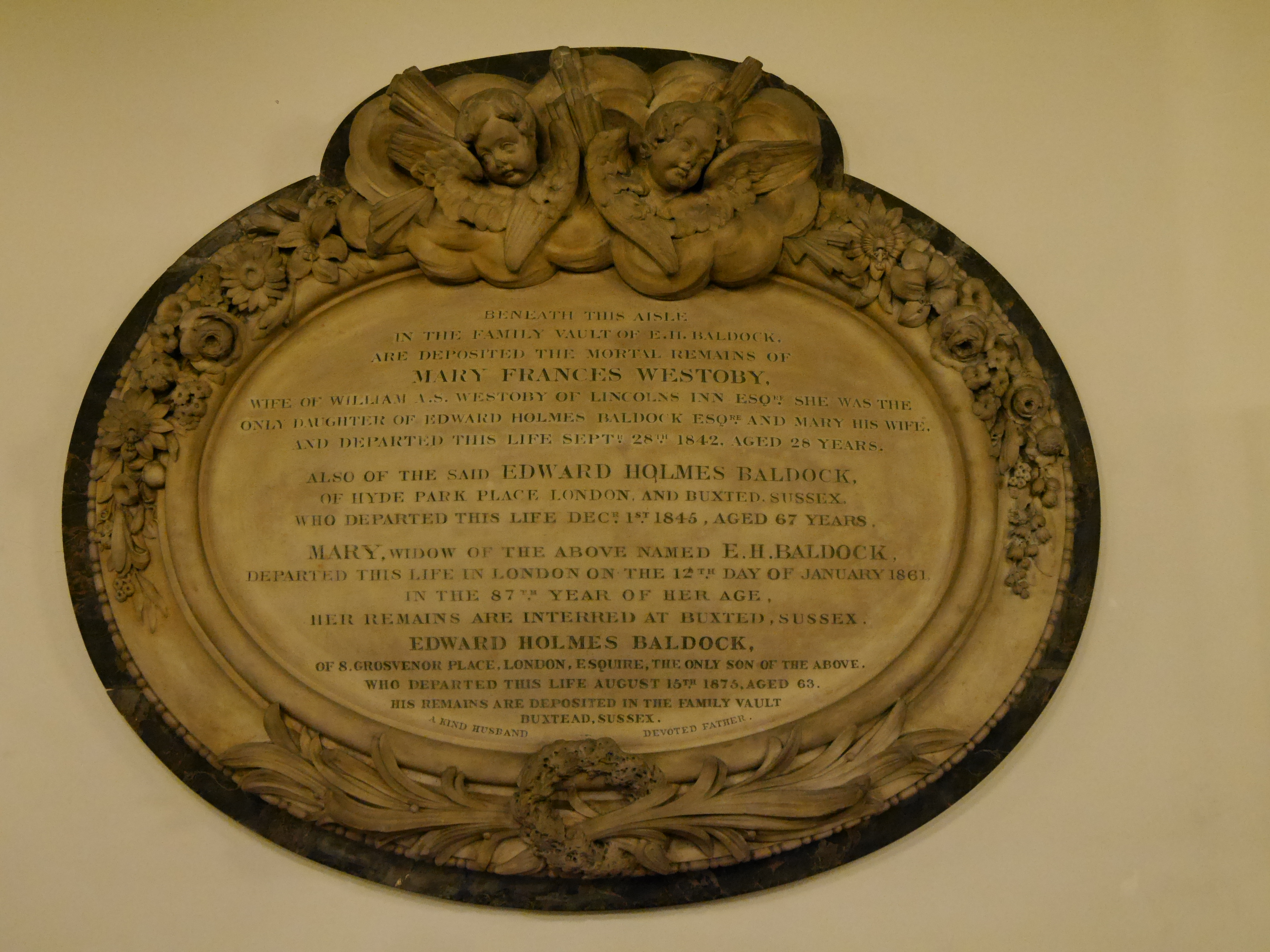
Memorial, St Pancras New Church, London

Edward Holmes Baldock (1812 – 15 August 1875) was a British Conservative Party politician. He was the son of Edward Holmes Baldock (dealer) (1777–1845), the prominent London dealer in French 18th-century furniture and reproductions.

He was elected at the 1847 general election as a member of parliament (MP) for the borough of Shrewsbury, and was re-elected in 1852. He did not contest the 1857 general election.

His daughter Eillen Costance married Francis Needham, 3rd Earl of Kilmorey, parents of the 4th Earl of Kilmorey.

Parliament of the United Kingdom
Preceded by George Tomline; Benjamin Disraeli	Member of Parliament for Shrewsbury; 1847–1857; With: Robert Aglionby Slaney 1847–1852; George Tomline 1852–1857	Succeeded by Robert Aglionby Slaney; George Tomline
