= Frederick Philbrick =

English barrister and philatelist (1835–1910)

His Honour Judge Frederick Philbrick KC
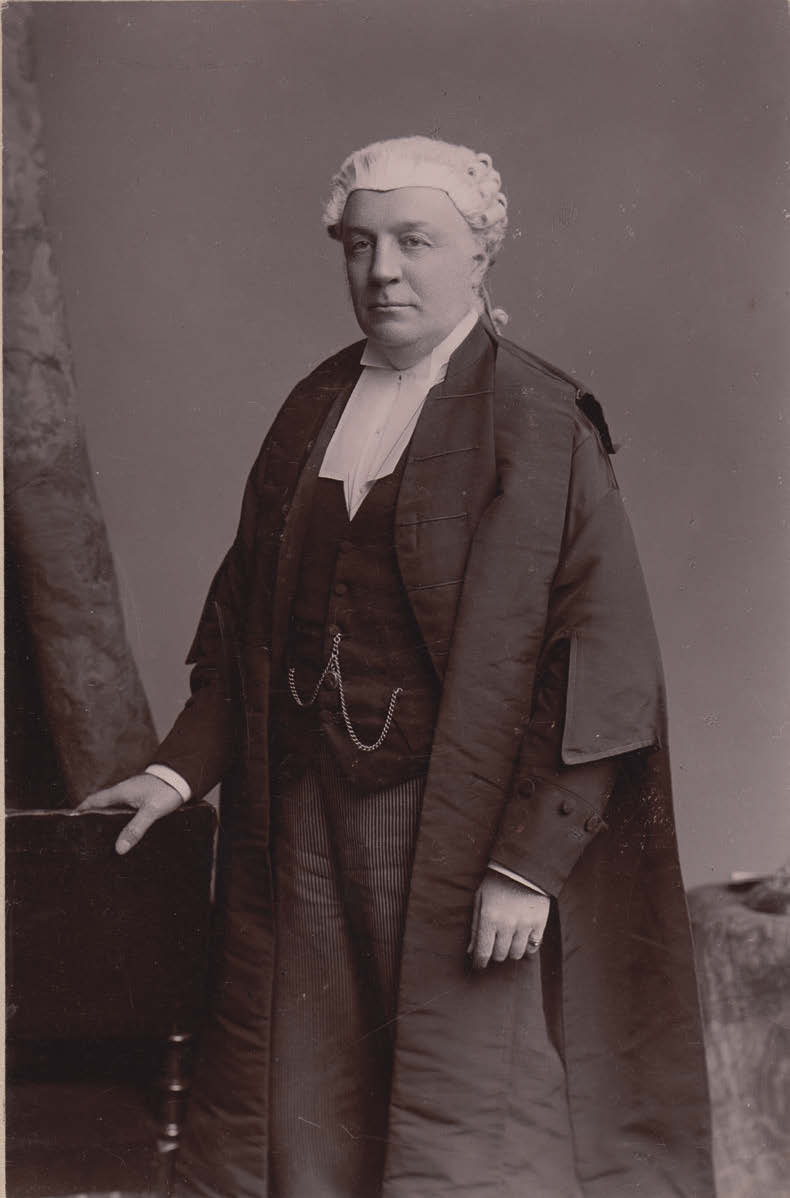
- Born: 13 June 1835; Colchester, England
- Died: 25 December 1910 (aged 75); Bournemouth, England
- Education: University of London
- Occupation: Judge

Frederick Adolphus Philbrick, KC (13 June 1835 – 25 December 1910) was an English barrister, judge and philatelist.

== Life and career ==
Born 13 June 1835, in Colchester, the eldest son of Frederick Blomfield Philbrick, Philbrick was educated at the University of London (BA 1853). He entered the Middle Temple in 1858 and was called to the bar in 1860, joining the Home Circuit. He was appointed Recorder of Colchester in 1870, a Queen's Counsel in 1874, and was elected a bencher of the Middle Temple in 1876. He was appointed a County Court Judge in 1895. He died on 25 December 1910, aged 75, in Bournemouth.

== Philately ==
In 1866, he acquired the collection of Georges Herpin, who in 1864, coined the word French word philatélie, which evolved into "philately".

He was one of the founders of the "Philatelic Society, London", which later became the Royal Philatelic Society London. He was its first Vice-President and was President of the Society between 1872 and 1892.

Philbrick was also an honorary member of the Fiscal Philatelic Society.

Two pseudonyms used by Philbrick in his philatelic writing were, An Amateur and Damus Petimusque Vicissim (the motto of British Guiana).

He was named as one of the "fathers of philately" on the Roll of Distinguished Philatelists.

== Publications ==
- The Postage and Telegraph Stamps of Great Britain, 1881. (With W.A.S. Westoby)
- "Notes on the Proofs and Essays of Great Britain" in Stamp Collectors Magazine, 1868.
