= Edward Holmes Baldock (dealer) =

English furniture dealer

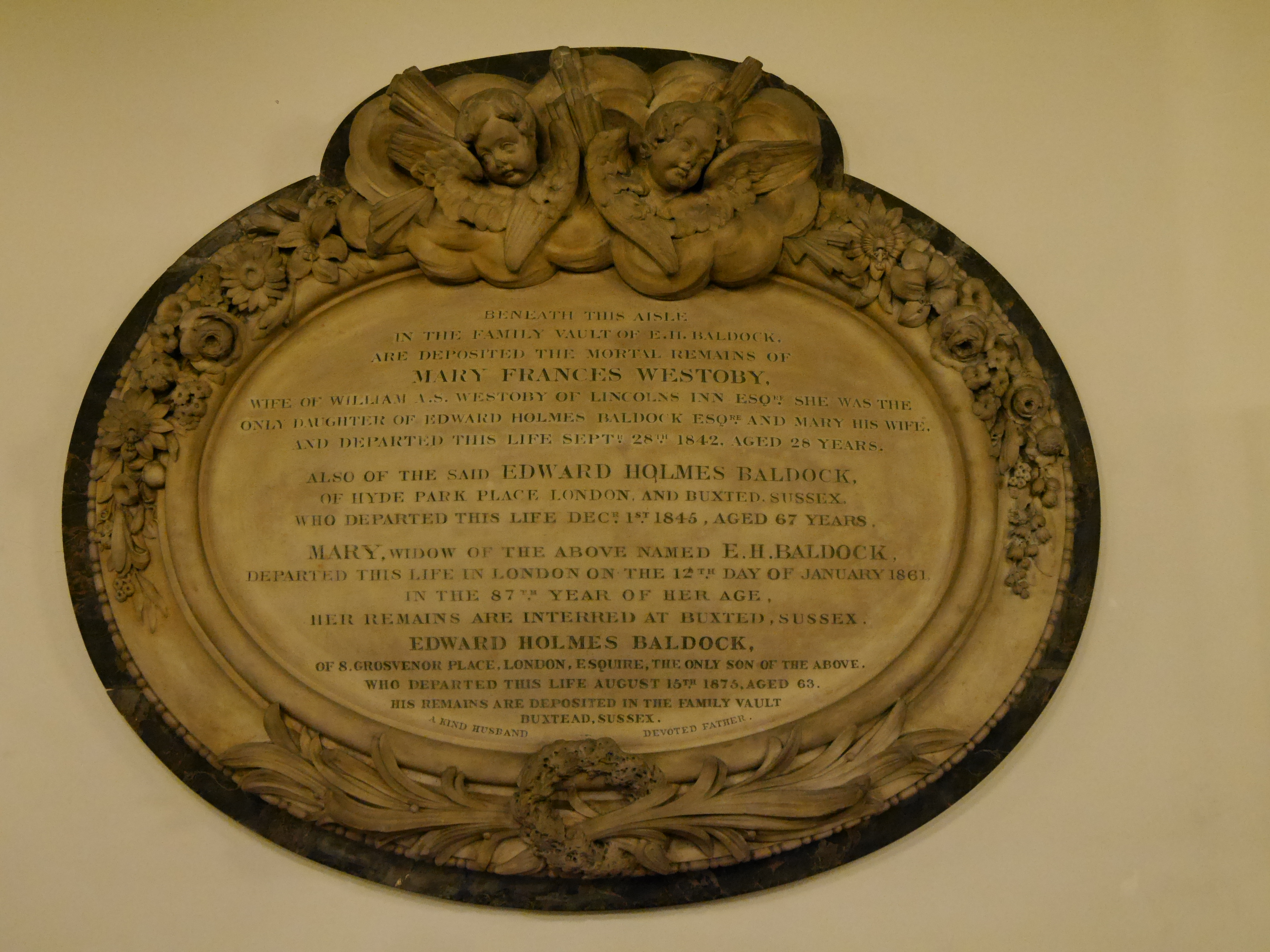
Memorial, St Pancras New Church, London

Edward Holmes Baldock (1777–1845) was a prominent London furniture dealer to the Royal Family, father of Edward Holmes Baldock.

He was first listed in the London trade directories in 1805. That listing had him operating out of No.7 Hanway Street in London, where he was described as selling "china and glass". An updated listing in 1821 described his business as "an antique furniture and ornamental furniture dealer", and in 1826 as a buyer and seller of "china, cabinets, screens, bronzes etc".

Between 1832 and 1837 he sold earthenware and glass products to William IV, and upon the ascendancy of Queen Victoria in 1837, sold china until his death in 1845.

Baldock was one of the first antique dealers and had something in common with the 18th century marchand-merciers Dominique Daguerre and Simon-Philippe Poirier.

== Personal life ==
He was the father of Edward Holmes Baldock (1812–1875), a British Conservative Party politician, and of Mary Frances Baldock, wife of the philatelist W. A. S. Westoby.
