= British Philatelic Association =

Association of stamp dealers

BPA Expertising logo

The British Philatelic Association is an association of stamp dealers best known for the work of BPA Expertising Limited, a business that provides opinions on the genuineness or otherwise of philatelic items submitted to them. During the Second World War, it operated a "Philatelic Import and Export Control" scheme in connection with controls on capital flows imposed by the British Government to protect the British economy. In 1992 the assets of the expertising business were given to a charity which publishes books and also receives the ongoing profits of the expertising business.

== Selected publications ==
- Nauru 1915 – 1923
- Pahang 1888 – 1903 The Chersonese Collection
- Zanzibar’s Postal History Legacy
- The Postage Dues of Zanzibar 1875-1964
