= Georges Herpin (philatelist) =

French stamp collector

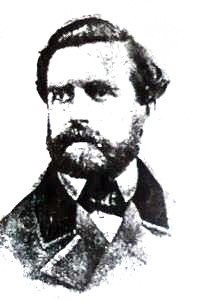
Georges Herpin

Georges Herpin was a 19th-century French stamp collector who in 1864 coined the French word philatélie, which in English became "philately".

Herpin, a pioneer in the science, stated that stamps had been collected and studied for the previous six or seven years and a better name was required for the new hobby than timbromanie ("obsession with stamps"), which was disliked. He took the Greek root words φιλ(ο)- phil(o)-, meaning "an attraction or affinity for something", and ἀτέλεια ateleia, meaning "exempt from duties and taxes", to form "philatélie". This etymology stems from the function of postage stamps: the introduction of official, paid stamps meant that the reception of letters was now free of charge, whereas before stamps it was normal for postal charges to be paid by the recipient of a letter or package.

In 1866, he sold his stamp collection to Frederick Adolphus Philbrick.
