= Railway stamp =

Postage stamp used for sending via rail

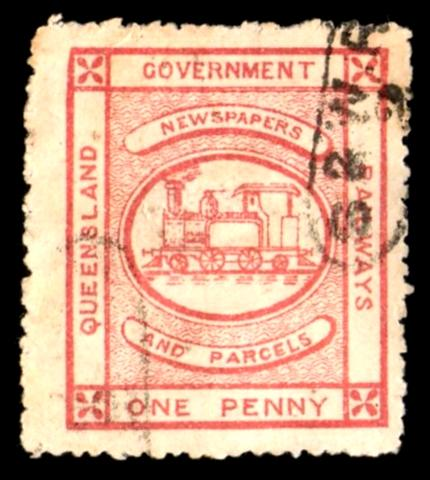
A used railway stamp from Queensland, Australia, for 1 penny valid for the transport of newspapers and parcels

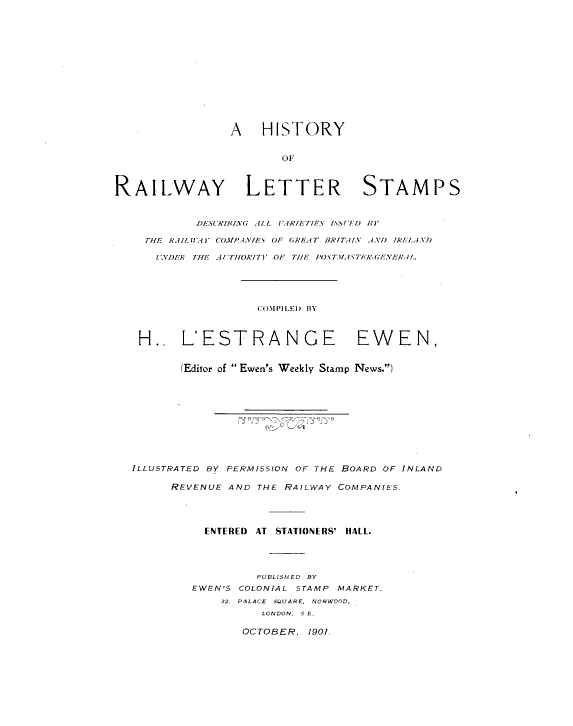
A History of Railway Letter Stamps (1901) by H. L'Estrange Ewen

In philately a railway stamp is a stamp issued to pay the cost of the conveyance of a letter or parcel by rail.

A wide variety of railway stamps have been issued by different countries and by private and state railways. Railway stamps of an unofficial or semi-official type are considered cinderella stamps.

The first railway stamp was issued in England in 1846 for parcels and Belgium has issued railway stamps since 1879.

From 1891 British mainline railway companies issued railway letter stamps for the conveyance of letters by rail, although that service has now ceased apart from on some small tourist lines.

== Railway stamps of Denmark ==
One of the countries that issued a lot of different railway stamps was Denmark. They were not only issued by Danske Statsbaner (Danish State Railways), but also by many local railway companies like Gribskovbanen (GDS), Hads-Ning Herreders Jernbane (HHJ) and Odsherreds Jernbane (OHJ).

== See also ==
- Parcel stamp
- Turner Collection of Railway Letter Stamps
