= Mount Brown (philatelist) =

British philatelist (1837–1919)

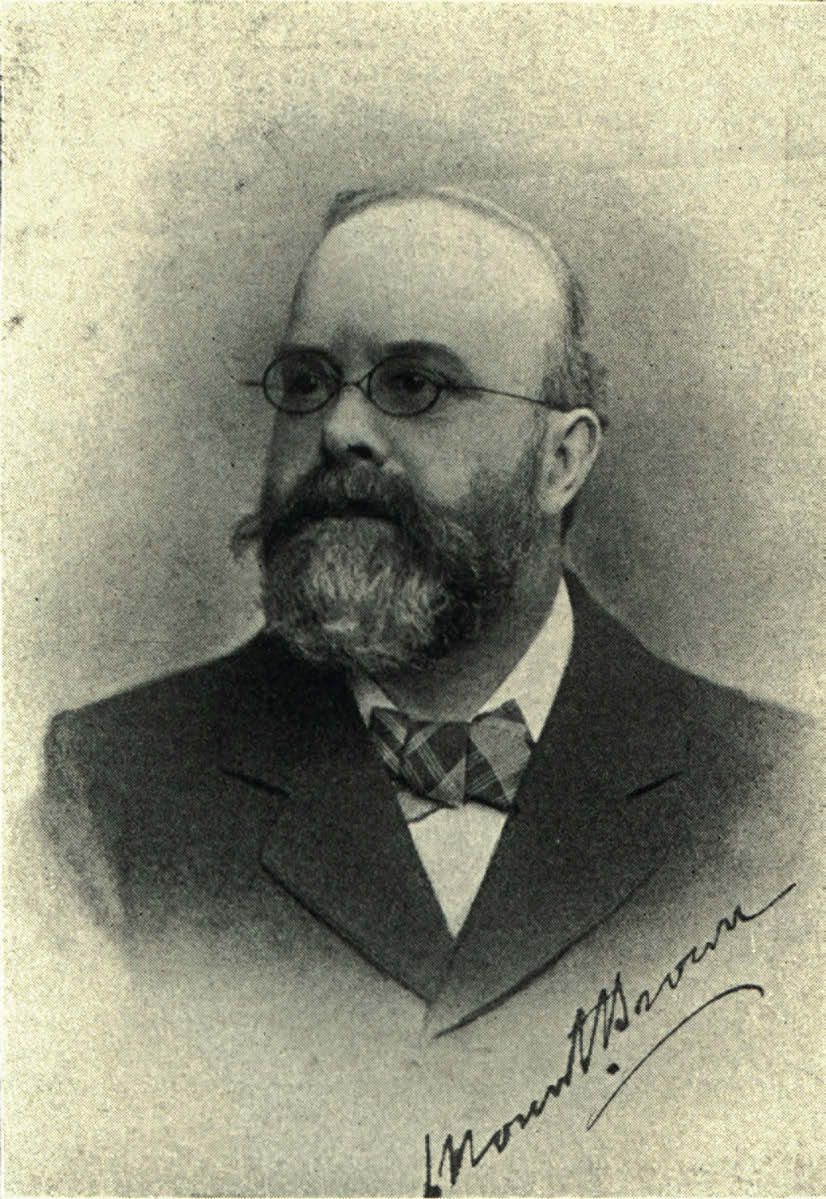
Mount Brown in a signed photograph probably taken before 1900.

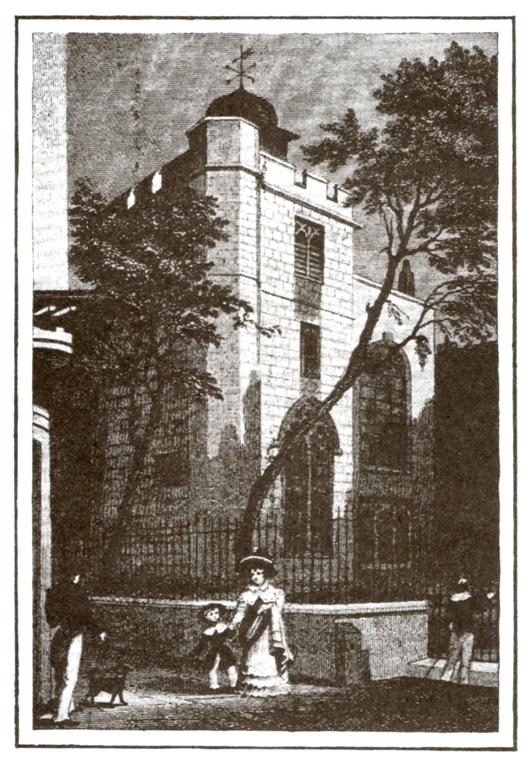
An old engraving of All Hallows Staining and Rectory where Mount Brown and his collaborators used to meet.

Mount Brown (1837-19 September 1919) was an early British philatelist and the compiler of only the second published stamp catalogue in the English language. Brown attended the City of London School and started to collect stamps in around 1860.

== Catalogues ==
Mount Brown published his Catalogue of British, Colonial, and Foreign Postage Stamps in May 1862, just weeks after Frederick Booty published his catalogue in April 1862, however, Brown's catalogue was more successful and reckoned to be more complete. Unlike Booty, Brown's catalogue was unillustrated. Others, such as Dr. Viner, may already have prepared unpublished hand-written lists of stamps. Brown's catalogue was more successful than Booty's and went through 7500 copies and five editions up to 1864.

Brown largely compiled his catalogue in the Rectory of All Hallows Staining, and he believed that the church there was the one mentioned by Charles Dickens in Dombey & Son. Mount Brown had a collection of about 400 stamps but was able to list 1200 different types in his first catalogue with the help of a group of like-minded collectors who met on Saturday afternoons to pool their knowledge. These included Dr. Charles W. Viner, Henry Haslett, Frederick Philbrick, William Hughes-Hughes, Sir Daniel Cooper and the Rev. Francis J. Stainforth. The Rev. Stainforth in particular was said to have had a very fine collection which largely formed the basis for Brown's catalogue.

The catalogue was quickly plagiarised, by John Kline, writing as A.C. Kline, in 1862, and by W.H. Wright writing as "A Collector" in 1863. According to The Stamp Collectors Magazine, Brown was well aware of the plagiarism and had arranged for all copies of Wright's work to be surrendered to him for destruction. He had also taken steps to prevent the introduction of Kline's work to Great Britain.

Addenda to the catalogue were published in The Stamp Collector's Magazine, of which Mr Viner was editor 1863-67, and revisions to the format of the catalogue took place in the third edition, following contact between Mount Brown and Dr. Gray of the British Museum. The number of stamps listed also expanded and details of forgeries began to be included.

== Philatelic business ==
As well as catalogues, a stamp album was available, billed as Mount Brown's Postage-Stamp or Crest Album, price seven and a half shillings, and lists of unused postage stamps.

By 1870 Brown's philatelic business was so great that he was forced to choose between it and his normal profession. He chose to give up philately but retained an interest, visiting the Junior Philatelic Society's exhibition in 1908 where he met Fred Melville.

== Organised philately ==
The small group who met at All Hallows Staining formed the nucleus of what became The Philatelic Society, London, which eventually became the Royal Philatelic Society London. Mount Brown was not a member of The Philatelic Society, possibly because it was open only to amateurs.

== Selected publications ==
- Catalogue of British, Colonial, and Foreign Postage Stamps: comprising upwards of 1200 varieties, 1st edition, F. Passmore, London, May 1862. (2nd edition June 1862, 3rd 1863, 4th 1863, 5th 1864.)

== See also ==
- Edward A. Oppen
