= Francis Stainforth =

British philatelist, conchologist, and book collector (1797–1866)

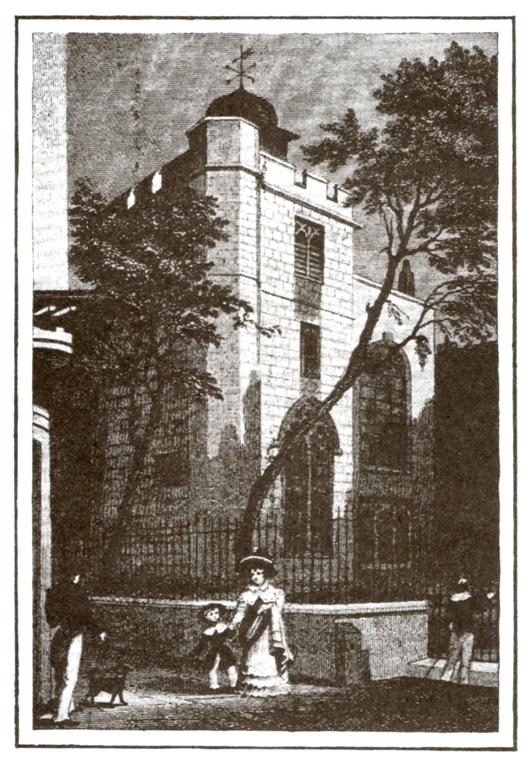
An old engraving of All Hallows Staining where Stainforth and fellow philatelists used to meet.

The Reverend Francis John Stainforth (1797 – 3 September 1866) was an early British philatelist, conchologist, and collector of books by women writers. He was the Perpetual curate of All Hallows Staining church in London, where Mount Brown compiled large parts of his catalogue. The church was believed to be the one mentioned by Charles Dickens in Dombey & Son.

Alumni Cantabrigienses, philatelic sources, and Stainforth's death certificate all give his forenames as Francis John. An 1894 work by the Rev. A. Povah records his name incorrectly as Frederick J.

== Early life and military career ==
Baptized on 14 December 1797, at St Peter-le-Poer in the City of London, Stainforth was the son of Richard Stainforth, by his marriage to Maria, the eldest child of Sir Francis Baring, 1st Baronet, of Devon. In 1817 he joined the Bengal Cavalry as a Cadet and by 1825 had been promoted to captain. Resigning his commission in 1827, he was admitted to St John's College, Cambridge, where he graduated BA in 1830 and was promoted to MA in 1833.

Stainforth had an older brother, George, born in 1796, who was educated at Eton and Trinity College, Cambridge, and was President of the Cambridge Union Society in 1816. He died at Cadogan Place, Belgravia, on 24 August 1820, aged 24.

On 23 January 1823, at Benares, Stainforth married Elizabeth, the youngest daughter of Dr Frazer, of London. She died young.

== Church career ==
In 1830, Stainforth was ordained as a deacon of the Church of England, and in 1834 as a priest. In 1841 he became Curate of Camden Chapel, Camberwell, in 1846 Curate of St Pancras, London, in 1852 Perpetual Curate of All Hallows', Staining.

In October 1838 he married secondly Elizabeth, daughter of Edward Southwell Ruthven.

== Origins of the Royal Philatelic Society ==
Stainforth met at the Rectory in 9 Mark Lane, which adjoined the church, on Saturday afternoons with a group of like-minded collectors to pool their knowledge. Apart from Mount Brown, these included Dr. Charles W. Viner, Henry Haslett, Frederick Philbrick, William Hughes-Hughes and Sir Daniel Cooper. Stainforth in particular was said to have had a very fine collection which largely formed the basis for Brown's catalogue.

The group that met at the church were thought to be the most serious British collectors of the day and have been credited with being the nucleus that eventually formed The Philatelic Society, London, which subsequently became the Royal Philatelic Society London, the oldest philatelic society in the world. Stainforth was never a member of the Society as he died before it was formed in 1869.
