= List of publications by Fred Melville =

Primarily philatelic books

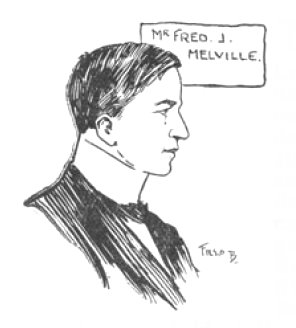
Fred Melville, as pictured in Gibbons Stamp Weekly, February 1905, at the time of the Junior Philatelic Exhibition.

A 1921 advert for the Melville stamp books.

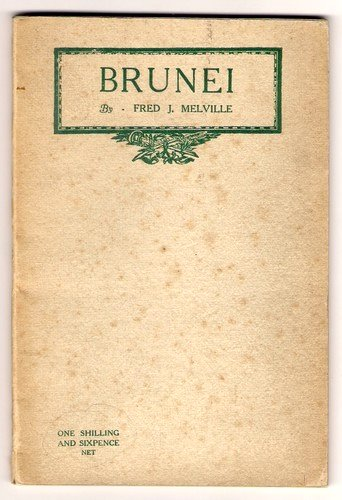
The cover of Brunei.

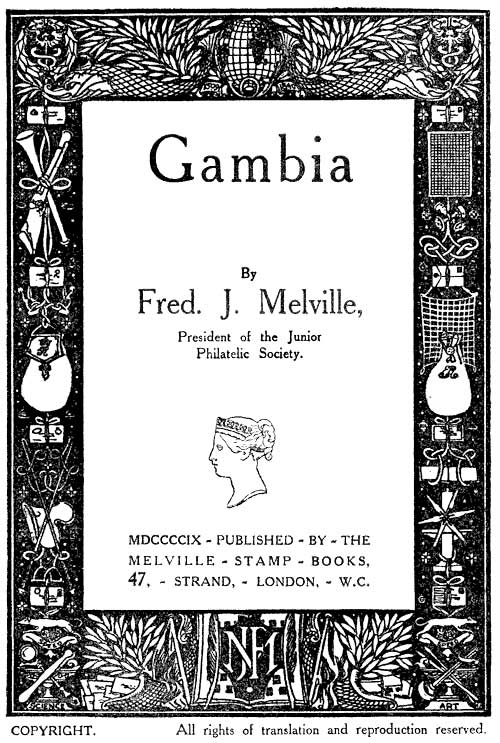
Title page of Gambia by Melville.

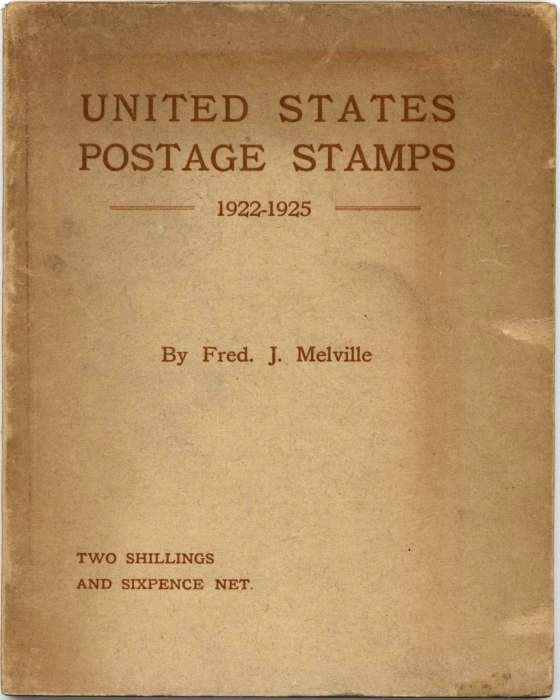
United States Postage Stamps 1922-1925.

This is a list of publications by Fred Melville. The list is primarily of philatelic books, however, Melville also wrote a great many articles about philately and in addition was editor of the popular journals Heartsease Library, Cosy Corner, Good Words and Sunday Magazine, for all of which he most probably produced articles.

== Melville Stamp Books ==
- British Central Africa and Nyasaland Protectorate, 1909, 84pp
- British New Guinea and Papua, 1909, 63pp
- Cape of Good Hope, 1913, 96pp
- Cayman Islands, 1912, 72pp
- Confederate States of America; Government Postage Stamps, 1913, 72pp
- Gambia, 1909, 84pp.
- Great Britain: Embossed Adhesive Stamps, 1910, 39pp
- Great Britain: King Edward VII Stamps, 1911, 83pp
- Holland, 1909, 77pp
- Jamaica, 1910, 89pp
- Nevis, 2nd edition 1910, 60pp (1st edition 1909)
- Portugal: Postage Stamps, 1880-1911, 1911, 85pp
- Portugal; The cameo stamps, 1911, 90pp
- St Helena, 1912, 92pp
- Tonga, 1909, 65pp
- United States Postage Stamps 1870-1893, 1910, 55pp
- United States Postage Stamps 1894-1910, 1910, 76pp

== Philatelic Institute publications ==
- Aero Stamp Collecting: A Practical Guide and Descriptive Catalogue, 2nd edition, 1924, 62p. (1st edition, 1923, 56p.)
- Aero Stamps: A descriptive catalogue with prices, November 1920, 16p.
- Andorra, 1936, 48p.
- Antigua, 1929, 57p.
- Azerbaijan, n.d. (1924), 24p. Philatelic Institute papers; no. 17.
- Baden, 1928, 59p.
- The Boys Own Guide to Stamp Collecting, 1924, 55p.
- The British Prisoners' Stamps of Ruhleben, 1919, 4p. Philatelic Institute papers; no. 2.
- Brunei, 1932, 37p.
- Cape of Good Hope: The Fourpence Black Triangular Stamp, 1927, 7p. Philatelic Institute papers; no. 19.
- The Complete Philatelist, 1924, 246p.
- The Grammar Of Philately, 1924, 18p. Philatelic Institute papers; no. 8.
- Great Britain: The Line Engraved Stamps, 3rd Edition, 1925, 82p. (Previous editions: 1909 and 1910).
- History from the Stamp Album, 1924, 16p. Philatelic Institute papers; no. 11.
- How to Collect War Stamps: practical and suggestive hints for the collector accompanying a representative collection of 100 different stamps issued during the Great War, 1919, 16p.
- Local Postage Stamps, 1924, 14p. Philatelic Institute papers; no. 13.
- Oil Rivers and Niger Coast Protectorates, 1924, 58p.
- Origins of the Penny Post, 1930, 130p.
- Phantom Philately: A descriptive list of stamps that are not what they seem, 1923, 204p.
- Philatelic Accessories, 1924, 15p. Philatelic Institute papers; no. 9.
- The Philatelic Library, 1924, 20p. Philatelic Institute papers; no. 16.
- The Postage Stamps of the Mozambique Company, 1918, 9p. Philatelic Institute papers; no. 3.
- Postal Stationery, c1924, 12p. Philatelic Institute papers; no. 14.
- Postmarks, c1924, 11p. Philatelic Institute papers; no. 15.
- A Simplified Collection, 1924, 8p. Philatelic Institute papers; no. 12.
- Switzerland: The Children's Stamps, Pro Juventute, 1925, 14p. Philatelic Institute papers; no. 10.
- United States Postage Stamps 1922-1925, 1925, 93p.
- The Victory Album of War Stamps, 1920, 44p.
- Virgin Islands, 1928, 68p.
- The War Stamps of Turkey, S.A., 14p. by Lieut.-Col. H Wood, edited by Fred J. Melville. Philatelic Institute papers; no. 5.

== Other publications ==
- A Penny All the Way. The Story of Penny Postage, W H Peckitt, 2nd edition, 1908, 48pp
- A Penny All the Way. The Story of Penny Postage, Warren H Colson, American edition, 1908, 34pp
- Abyssinia, C Baldwin, 1909, 31pp
- All about Postage Stamps, T. Werner Laurie, London, 1914, 255pp
- An Historical Catalogue of the Stamps of the New Europe, 2nd edition 1919, 48pp
- An Innocent Afloat, F J Melville, 1926, 15pp
- Catalogue of War Stamps, 1914–15, J F Spriggs, 1st edition 1915, 16pp
- Catalogue of War Stamps, 1914–15, J F Spriggs, 2nd edition 1915, 48pp
- Chats on Postage Stamps, Fisher & Unwin, 1911, 362pp
- Chats on Postage Stamps, Frederick A Stokes Company, American edition, 1911, 362pp
- El nuevo ABC del coleccionista de sellos, Santiago de Cuba, Arroyo Hnos, Castilian edition of The New ABC of Stamp Collecting translated by J D Sague, 1926, 166pp
- Egypt, Stanley Gibbons, London, 1915, 84pp
- Frimärken Värda Förmögenheter, Sveriges Filatelist-Förenings Förlag, Swedish edition of Postage Stamps Worth Fortunes translated by L Harald Kjellstedt, 1910, 43pp
- Great Britain: Reel printing for postage stamps, 1924, 7pp
- Guide to Stamp Collecting, G F Rapkin, 1924, 60pp
- How to Start a Philatelic Society, Peckitt, 1910
- Latvia Map Stamps. A tentative check list, 1922
- Les premières emissions de timbres de la Grande-Bretagne, Mendel, French edition of Great Britain: The Line Engraved Stamps translated by Georges Brunel, 1912
- Les timbres de Gambie, Édition des publications modernes, French edition of Gambia translated by Georges Brunel, 1914
- Les timbres de la Jamaïque, Édition des publications modernes, French edition of Jamaica translated by Georges Brunel, 1914
- Modern Stamp Collecting, English Universities Press Ltd, 1940, 316pp
- New Hebrides, C Baldwin, c1910, 20pp
- Phantom Philately; a descriptive list of stamps that are not what they seem, Emile Bertrand, 1950, 204pp (with a foreword by Lowell Ragatz)
- Pioneer Stamp Men of Liverpool, W G Warner, 1926, 19pp
- Postage Stamp Printing, Pardy, 1925, 19pp
- Postage Stamps in the Making, Stanley Gibbons, 1916, 198pp
- Postage Stamps of the Hawaiian Islands in the Collection of Henry J. Crocker of San Francisco, Stamp Lover, 1908, 9pp
- Postage Stamps of the United States of America, Junior Philatelic Society, 1905, 116pp
- Postage Stamps worth Fortunes, (self published), 1908, 46pp
- Postage Stamps worth Fortunes, Severn-Wylie-Jewett Co, American edition, 1918
- Rare stamps: How to Recognize Them, Melville Book Co, 1922, 46pp
- Siam: Its Posts and Postage Stamps, Stamp Collectors' Fortnightly, 1906, 53pp.
- Stamp Collecting, 1897.
- Stamp Collections for War Museums, Stanley Gibbons, 1918, 40pp
- Stamps of the Steamship Companies: A Rough List, 1915, 34pp
- The ABC of Stamp Collecting, Henry J Drane, 1903, 159pp
- The Boys Friend Book of Stamps of the British Empire, 1925, 19pp
- The Cradle of the Postage Stamp, Harmer Rooke, 1923 30pp
- The Lady Forger: an original play, Junior Philatelic Society, 1906
- The Mayfair find of Rare Stamps, H R Harmer, 1925, 44pp
- The Mystery Of the Shilling Green, Chas Nissen & Co Ltd, 1926, 16pp
- The New ABC of Stamp Collecting, Melville Stamp Company, 1922, 145pp
- The Postage Stamp in War, 1915, 160pp
- The Postage Stamps of British Central Africa, Severn-Wylie-Jewett, 1918, 28pp
- The postage stamps of China; with a history of the Chinese Imperial Post, 1908, 44pp
- The Postage Stamps of Great Britain, Junior Philatelic Society, 1904, 56pp
- The Postage Stamps of Hayti, C Nissen & Co, 1905, 69pp
- The Postage Stamps of Sarawak 1869-1906, C Nissen & Co, 1907, 84pp
- The Postage Stamps of the Cayman Islands, Severn-Wylie-Jewett, 1920, 22pp
- The Romance of Postage Stamps, W.H. Peckitt, London, 1910, 36pp
- The Romance of Postage Stamps: A Short Introduction to the Joys of the Stamp album, Peckitt, 1908, 30pp
- The Soldier and His Stamps Together with the Junior Philatelic Society's Roll of Honour, Stanley Gibbons, 1918, 60pp.
- The Tapling Collection of Stamps and Postal Stationery at the British Museum, 1905.
- The Wm. H. Crocker Collection of rare stamps of the whole World, Harmer Rooke & Co., 1938, 42pp
- The World's Stamp Errors Part I The British Empire, W H Peckitt, 1910, 59pp (under pseudonym Miss Fitte)
- The World's Stamp Errors Part II Foreign Countries, W H Peckitt, 1910, 50pp (under pseudonym Miss Fitte)
- Then and Now, Whitfield King, 1938, 43pp
- United States Postage Stamps 1847-1869, Stanley Gibbons, 3rd edition 1915, 71pp
- United States Special Service Stamps, Stanley Gibbons, 1915, 69pp
- War Stamps of Salonika & Long Island, Stanley Gibbons, 1916, 54pp
