= Percival Loines Pemberton =

British philatelist and stamp dealer (1875–1949)

- Born: 4 May 1875
- Died: 11 June 1949 (aged 74)
- Occupations: Philatelist, stamp dealer
- Parent: Edward Loines Pemberton (father)
- Awards: Roll of Distinguished Philatelists (1921)

Percival Loines Pemberton (4 May 1875 – 11 June 1949), was a British philatelist and stamp dealer who signed the Roll of Distinguished Philatelists in 1921. He was the son of Edward Loines Pemberton (1844–1878) who was also an eminent philatelist.

== Stamp dealing ==
Pemberton started as a dealer in Manchester in 1893 aged seventeen, and joined the Manchester Philatelic Society. There he met Walter Dorning Beckton, a future president of The Royal Philatelic Society, London, James H. Abbott and many other members of what was called The Manchester School. Pemberton did little business in Manchester, however, and in 1896 he moved to London. There he was able to participate in larger auctions, where the bidders were sometimes given alcoholic drinks to encourage the bidding, and he was able to make many contacts.

In 1897 Pemberon was able to buy part of the collection of Adelaide Lucy Fenton (who wrote under the pen name Fentonia), one of the first lady collectors, with whom his father had frequently crossed swords in the pages of Stamp-Collector's Magazine, according to Percival, without ever knowing that Fentonia was a woman. Pemberton was in partnership with W.B. Kirkpatrick, then E.P. Airlie Dry. In 1921 he and his son went into business with Alexander J. Sefi. Together, they donated the Sefi-Pemberton Cup to The Junior Philatelic Society, now the National Philatelic Society. His son, A.L. Pemberton, became a director of the firm, which continued until 1956 when it was acquired by Robson Lowe.

From 1900 Pemberton's business included the Philatelic Journal of Great Britain, which he also edited. This was the official organ of the International Philatelic Union and, from 1938, the official publication of the Manchester, City of London, Herts and Birmingham Philatelic Societies. After Robson Lowe acquired the Pemberton business in 1956, including the Philatelic Journal, it was incorporated into Lowe's The Philatelist.

== Stamp collecting ==
Pemberton had wide collecting interests and wrote on most countries in the fifty volumes of the Philatelic Journal of Great Britain, but his principal interest was the first stamps of Greece, about which he wrote and corresponded extensively. He was a member of the British Philatelic Association Expert Committee and The Fiscal Philatelic Society, and a corresponding member of the L'Académie de Philatélie

== Publications ==
- "The Stamps of Greece" – a series of articles published in The Philatelic Journal of Great Britain, 1911–1914.
- Priced Descriptive Catalogue of the Stamps of Greece (1923).
