= Peter John Anderson =

- Born: 1853
- Died: 12 May 1926 (aged 72–73)
- Occupation: Librarian

Peter John Anderson (1853 – 12 May 1926) was the Librarian of the University of Aberdeen from 1894 and a noted philatelist who signed the Roll of Distinguished Philatelists in 1921. He was Secretary of the New Spalding Club and President of the Aberdeen and North of Scotland Philatelic Society. He bequeathed his collection of philatelic literature to the University.

== Early life ==
Peter John Anderson was the only son of Agnes Shaw Grant (daughter of Isabella Grant and Alexander Grant of Dundreggan, Glenmoriston) and Peter Anderson (1804–1868), solicitor in Inverness. He was "gold medallist of the Royal Academy in two successive years, and a graduate of the Universities of Aberdeen and Edinburgh ... and Secretary of the New Spalding Club." His sister, Isabel Harriet Grant Anderson, wrote a detailed family history, titled An Inverness Lawyer and His Sons, 1796–1878, about their father, their uncles John and George Anderson, and of their grandfather, Peter Anderson (1768–1823), Procurator Fiscal for the Burgh.

== Librarianship and bibliographical activities ==
Anderson was said to be indefatigable in his aim to make Aberdeen University library the best in the country. He was one of the founders, and the Secretary from the start, of the New Spalding Club which published scholarly works about the history of Aberdeenshire.

== Philatelic writing ==
Anderson was a prolific correspondent on matters philatelic, particularly in relation to literature, of which he seemed to possess, or have examined, a great deal. His first appearance in a philatelic journal was in The Stamp-Collector's Magazine of May 1869 when he would have been about sixteen years of age. He was a frequent contributor to The Philatelic Record, being noted from 1880 when he wrote about the earliest appearances in philatelic literature of the early stamps of Mauritius. In 1883 he wrote to the Record from the Aberdeen Conservative Club (as he often did) about discrepancies in the accounts of the use of British impressed newspaper stamps, comparing descriptions he had seen in different journals. In Volume 6 he wrote about varieties of imitations of the Mulready Envelope and the numbers of stamps reported in different catalogues, and, beginning in Volume 7, about early English philatelic literature which series he subsequently turned into a book.

== Selected publications ==
- Early English Philatelic Literature 1862–65. London: The Philatelic Literature Society, 1912. (with B. T. K. Smith)
- Philatelic Literature Collecting in 1864–79: Reminiscences and extracts from a diary. London: P.J. Anderson, 1919. (Limited to 30 copies privately circulated)
