= The Stamp-Collector's Review and Monthly Advertiser =

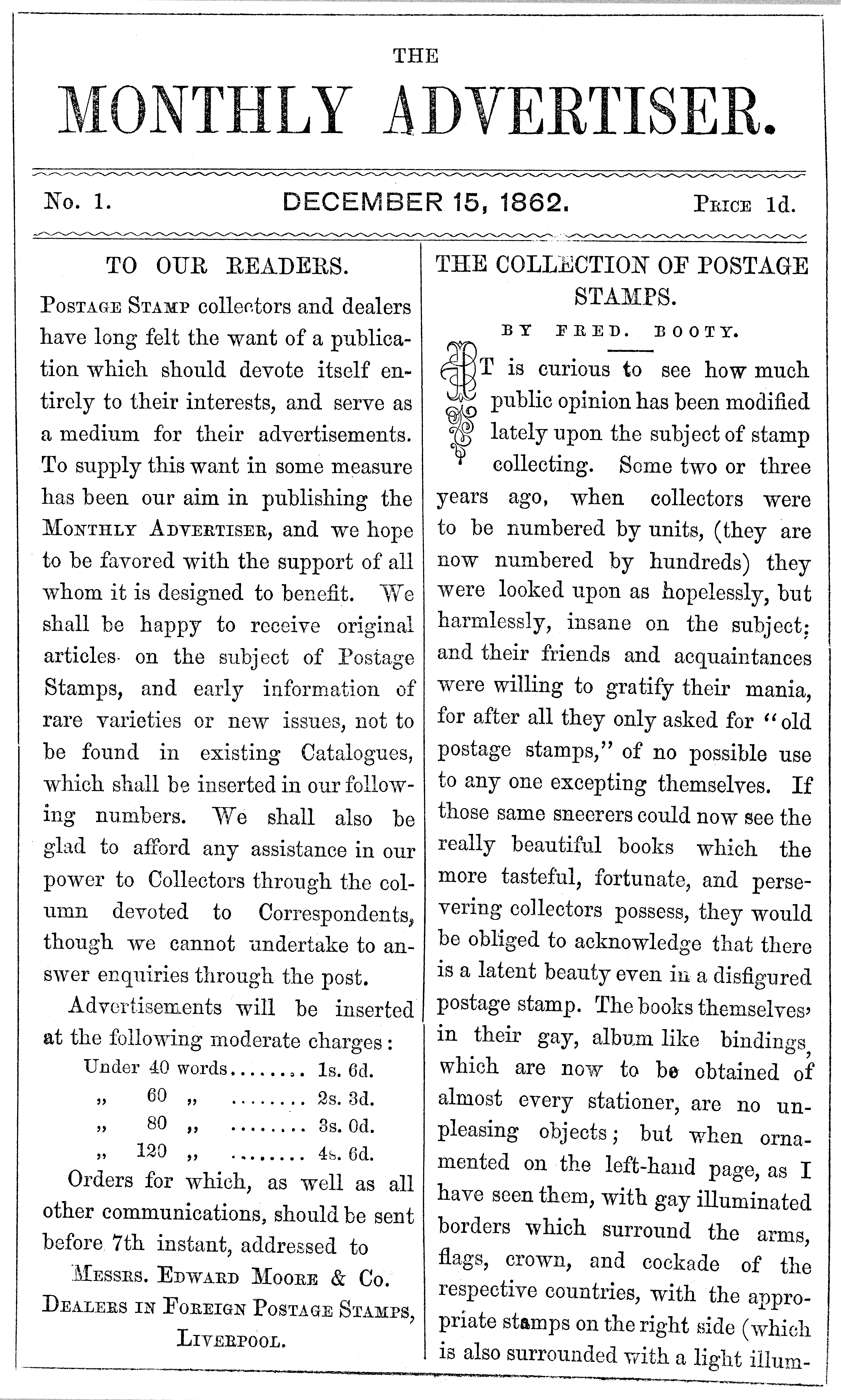
Front cover of first issue of Stamp Collectors' Review and Monthly Advertiser, the world's first dedicated philatelic magazine, initially named The Monthly Advertiser

The Stamp-Collector's Review and Monthly Advertiser (originally the Monthly Advertiser then The Stamp-Collector's Monthly Advertiser) was one of the earliest philatelic magazines. It was published by Edward Moore & Co. of Liverpool from 15 December 1862 (Vol. 1, No. 1) to 15 June 1864 (Vol. 2, No. 19). Edward Loines Pemberton was the editor from January 1864.

== See also ==
- The Philatelic Record
- The Stamp-Collector's Magazine
