= A. J. Sefi =

British philatelist

Alexander Joseph Sefi (1889 in St. Pancras, London – 10 October 1934, in Kensington, London) was an English philatelist and stamp dealer who signed the Roll of Distinguished Philatelists in 1933.

== Early life ==
Sefi was educated at the Merchant Taylors' School. Later, he spent three years conducting geological and scientific expeditions in Asia Minor, Syria and Arabia.

== Stamp dealing ==
Sefi worked in association with David Field who published several of his works. In 1921 he joined P.L. Pemberton and E.L. Pemberton as Sefi, Pemberton & Co. Ltd. Together, they donated the Sefi-Pemberton Cup to The Junior Philatelic Society, now the National Philatelic Society. The firm continued until 1956 when it was acquired by Robson Lowe.

== Philately ==
Sefi edited the Philatelic Journal of Great Britain from 1926, and also Philatelic World and The West-End Philatelist. He researched the silk thread issues of Switzerland 1854-62. In philatelic literature, his magnum opus was his masterful "An Introduction to Advanced Philately...", re-issued in facsimile form by the Royal Philatelic Society London in 2010. At the time of his death, he was engaged with C.H. Mortimer in preparing a book on Jammu-Kashmir which was eventually published in 1937. He won the Bates Prize at the 1923 Philatelic Congress of Great Britain in London, and the Congress Cup for his paper "Forgeries and Fakes" at the 1929 Birmingham Congress. His philatelic interests were wide and he contributed numerous articles to philatelic periodicals.

== Other ==
Sefi played bridge for England.

== Selected publications ==
- The Postage Stamps of Grenada. London: D. Field, 1912.
- King Edward VII Land. London: D. Field, 1912
- The Postage Stamps of Malta. London: D. Field, 1913.
- An Introduction to Advanced Philately, with special reference to typical methods of stamp production. London: Rowley & Rowley, 1926. (2nd edition 1932)
- The stamps of Jammu-Kashmir: including chapters on postal history, obliterations, post cards and telegraph stamps. London: Sefi, Pemberton & Co. Ltd., 1937 (with C.H. Mortimer).
