= James H. Abbott =

British philatelist

James Henry Abbott
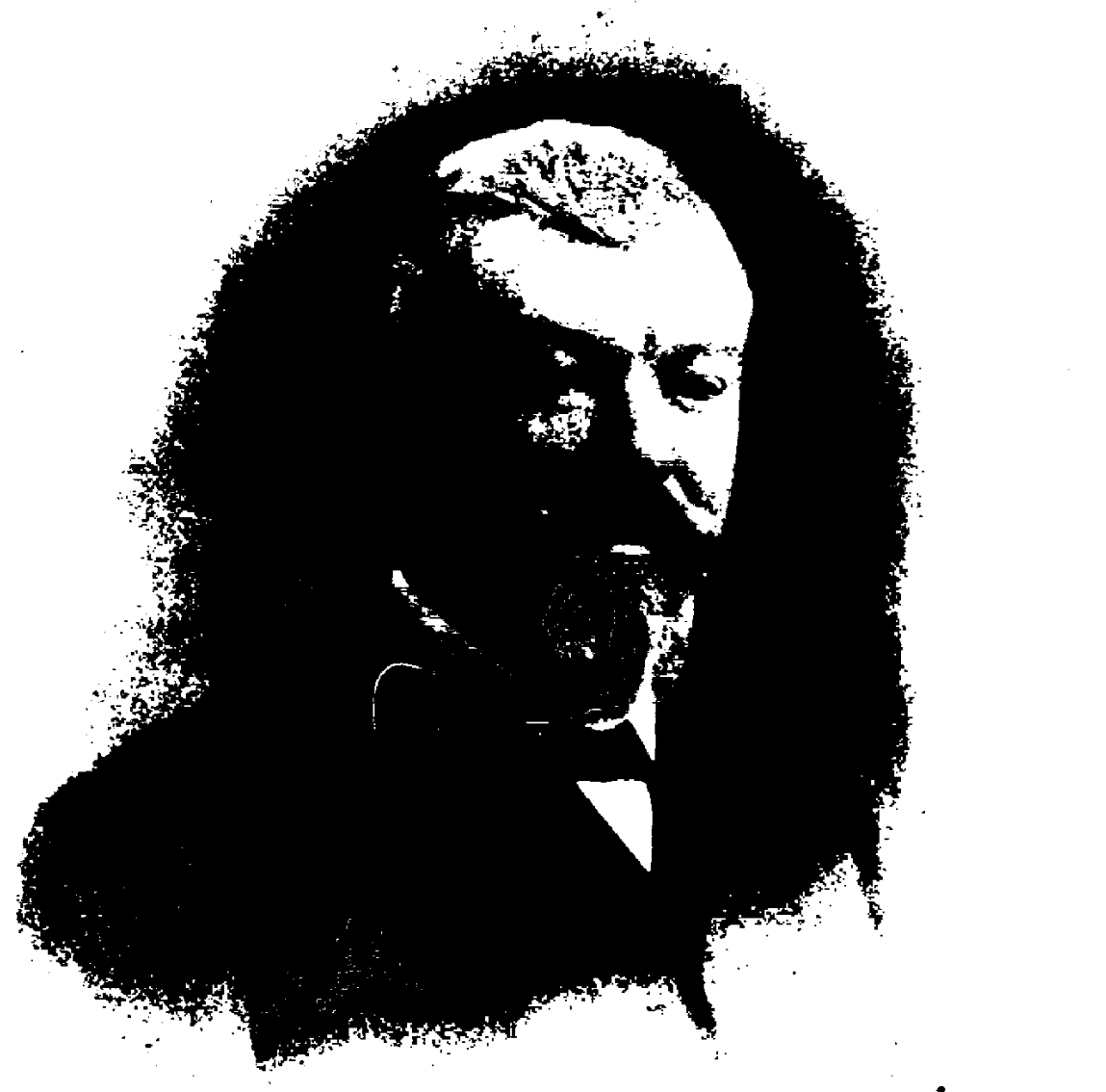
- Born: 1851
- Died: 1 March 1914 (aged 62–63)
- Occupation: Philatelist

James Henry Abbott (1851 – 1 March 1914) was a British philatelist who was one of the "Fathers of Philately" entered on the Roll of Distinguished Philatelists in 1921.

Abbott joined the Royal Philatelic Society London in 1892, subsequently becoming a fellow of that society and remaining a member until his death.

He was senior vice-president of the Manchester Philatelic Society and was also known as the "Father of the Manchester School" for his practice, with Walter Dorning Beckton, of accumulating large blocks and sheets of stamps in order to study the position of overprints.

The London Philatelist reported that, on his death, Abbott "...left all his property, including, of course, his stamps, to his only relative, a half sister, with whom he lived. It was this lady who determined that the collection should go to some public institution in Manchester if any would accept the gift, and the offer was made to the Whitworth Institute and accepted by them." Less important items were sold at auction in 1914. In 1968 the donated stamps were sold by H.R. Harmer Ltd in a four-day sale.
