= SEFI =

SEFI may refer to

- Société Européenne pour la Formation des Ingénieurs or European Society for Engineering Education

== People with the name ==
- Michael Sefi (born 1943), British philatelist
- Sefi Atta (born 1964), Nigerian author and playwright
- Sefi Rivlin (1947-2013), Israeli actor and comedian
- A. J. Sefi (1889-1934), British philatelist
- Sefi Vigiser, one of the founder of Mirabilis
