= Oppen =

Oppen is a surname. Notable people with the surname include:

- George Oppen (1908–1984), was an American poet.
- Mary Oppen (1908–1990), American activist, artist, photographer, poet and writer.
- Carl Lauritz Mechelborg Oppen (1830–1914), Norwegian jurist and politician.
- Edward A. Oppen, creator of one of the first stamp catalogues in English.
