= Charlotte Tebay =

British philatelist

Charlotte Waylen Tebay (21 September 1819 – 22 December 1901) was a British philatelist. She was one of the first women philatelists and helped to organise the first stamp exhibitions in London.

She was born in Devizes, Wiltshire, to Robert and Sarah Waylen. She was baptised in a Baptist church as a nonconformist. In 1860, she married Dr. Thomas George Tebay. Like Adelaide Lucy Fenton, Tebay was one of the first members of the Royal Philatelic Society, London, being elected in April 1876, and many early meetings of the society were held at the Tebays' home at 37 Belgrave Road in London.

In 1897, Tebay was one of the first collectors to exhibit the primitive Ugandan Cowrie stamps.

She died on 22 December 1901, at the age of 82.
