= Edward Pemberton =

Edward Pemberton may refer to:

- Edward Leigh Pemberton (1823–1910), English politician
- Edward Loines Pemberton (1844–1878), philatelist and stamp dealer
