= Charles Viner =

British philatelist (1812–1906)

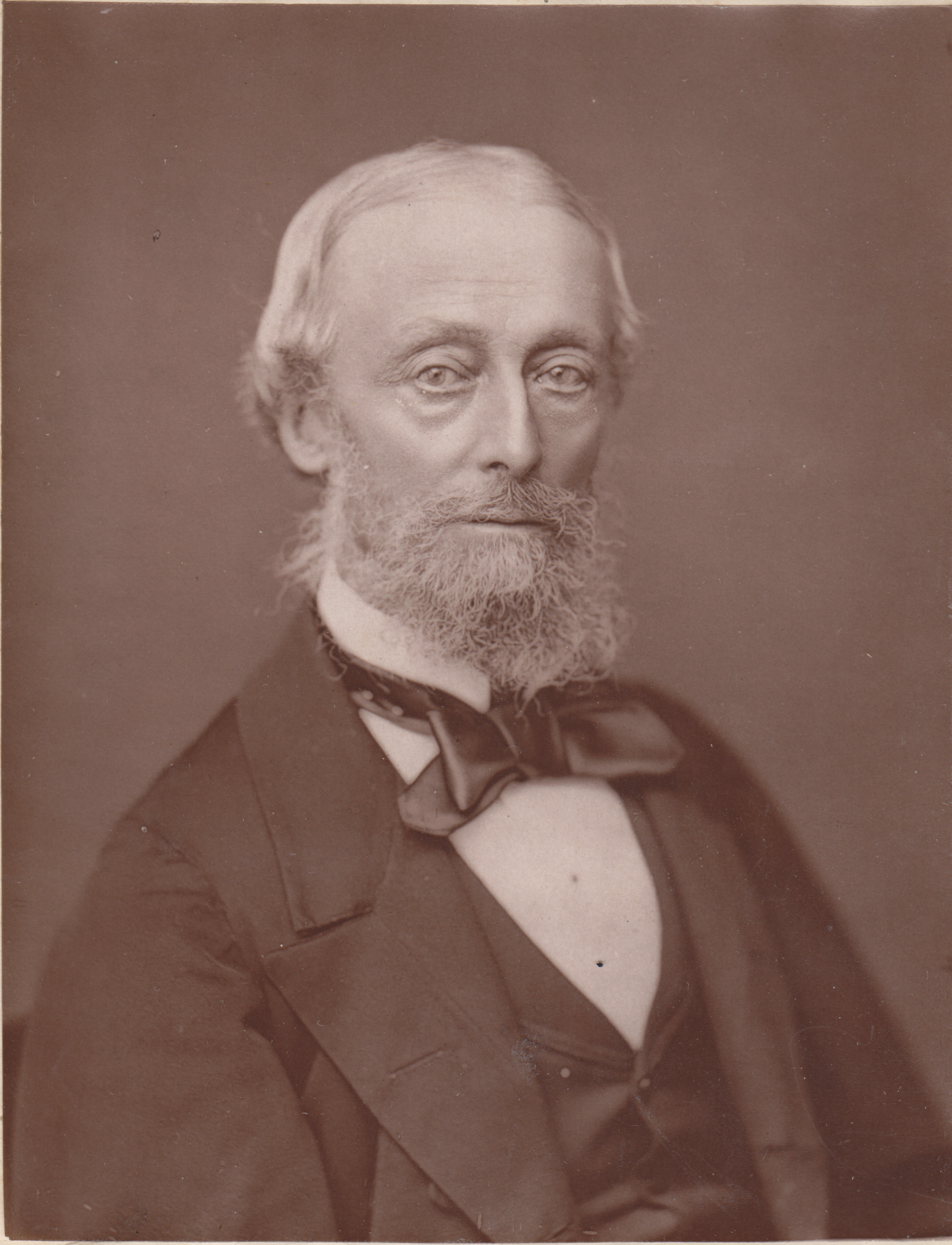
- Charles Viner in 1882
- Born: Charles William Viner; 1812
- Died: 14 March 1906 (aged 93–94)
- Occupation: Philatelist

Charles William Viner A.M., Ph.D., (1812 – 14 March 1906) was a British philatelist who was a founding member of the Philatelic Society, London, later to become the Royal Philatelic Society London, and who was present at the initial meeting of the society on 10 April 1869, and serving as its Secretary from 1871 to 1874. His obituary in The London Philatelist referred to him as the "Father of Philately" and elsewhere he was described as the vieille garde (old guard) of philately having been actively collecting and writing about stamps since 1860. In 1921 he was entered on the Roll of Distinguished Philatelists as one of the founding Fathers of philately.

== Early days ==
According to Fred Melville, Viner first became interested in stamp collecting in about 1855 when a lady friend asked him to help her compile a chart representative of the stamps of the world, but Viner did not start his own collection until 1860. However, he noted in 1882 that he saw his first collection in 1854 which was based on an earlier collection owned by someone called Scales. Viner was quoted as saying in 1889: "I remember counting my stamps with much glee when they reached a hundred." and "I saw some collections with two or three hundred and heard of one with five hundred. Cancelled specimens were principally seen; but I can recall one collection rich in unused Naples, Sicily, Tuscany and other Italian States purchased at their several post-offices by a young traveller."

== Philatelic literature ==
Viner assisted Mount Brown in compiling his catalogue and edited Stamp Collector's Magazine for four years from 1863 where supplements to Brown's catalogue were published and which included numerous contributions by Viner. The pages of the magazine contain a number of spirited but good-humoured exchanges between Viner and Adelaide Lucy Fenton, another early philatelist.

Viner translated and published J.B. Moen's Postage Stamps Illustrated - A General Nomenclature of Every Postage Stamp and Facsimiles of All Types issued up to the present time in the Different Countries of the World 1840-1864. In 1865 Viner became compiler of Edward Oppen's Postage Stamp Album and Catalogue and produced 24 editions up to 1891. He was also the Editor of The Philatelist between 1866 and 1876.
