= Maitland Burnett =

British philatelist (1844–1918)

- Born: Maitland James Burnett c. 1844
- Died: 15 September, 1918 (aged 73–74)
- Occupation: Philatelist

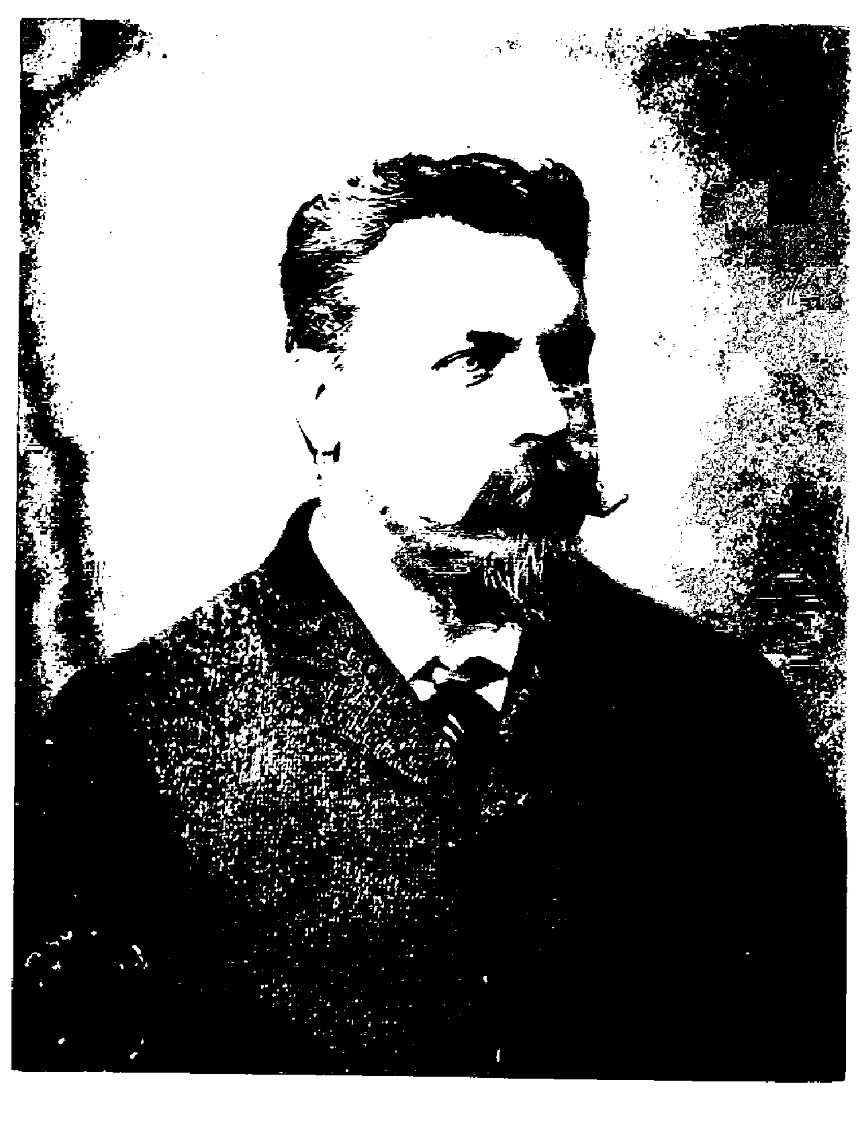
Maitland Burnett, portrait from The Philatelic Record, 1887

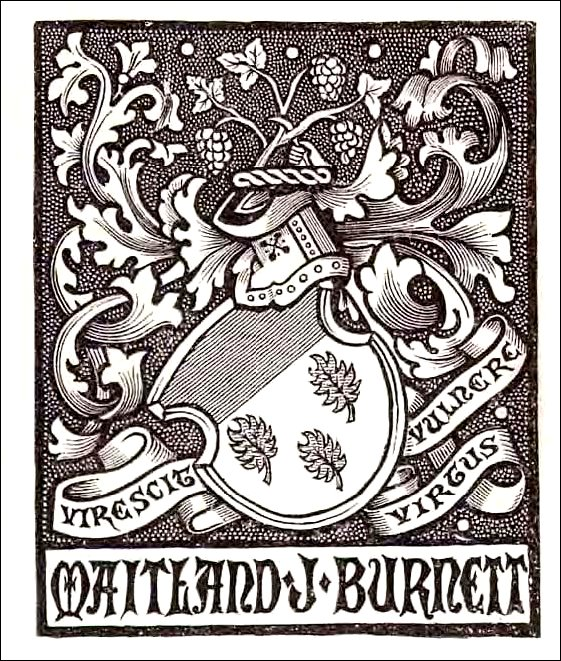
Burnett's bookplate from before 1900.

Maitland James Burnett (c. 1844 – 15 September 1918) was a British philatelist who was one of the "Founding fathers of Philately" entered on the Roll of Distinguished Philatelists in 1921. He was also editor of The Philatelic Record for the first seven years of its existence from 1879.

== Early life ==
At the age of 15, Burnett was sent to Frankfurt to complete his education and it was there that he began to collect stamps. On his return to Scotland he gave his collection to his sister before beginning his legal training. His sister did not add to the collection and subsequently Burnett decided to renew his interest in stamps.

== Organised philately ==
Burnett joined The Philatelic Society London, now The Royal Philatelic Society London, in March 1877, subsequently becoming a Fellow of the society. Many early meetings of the society took place at Burnett's chambers in Gray's Inn.

== Hard times ==
According to Brian Birch, Burnett fell on hard times in 1887 following the crash of his business interests in the West Indies and ceased his subscription to the Royal Philatelic Society London.

He left England in 1885 and disposed of his collection, part of which passed to Thomas Tapling. After 1885 he lived mainly in Belgium and Luxembourg and later in Italy. He was an expert on the Dutch language. Burnett died in Rome in 1918.

Burnett was the head of an old Scottish family from Peeblesshire where he was also a Justice of the Peace.
