= Johnny Johnson (philatelist) =

British stamp dealer and philatelist

Herbert Frederick "Johnny" Johnson
- Johnson in 1923.
- Born: 12 February 1884
- Died: 20 April 1966 (aged 82)
- Occupations: Stamp dealer, philatelist
- Known for: Key figure in early years of Junior Philatelic Society

Herbert Frederick "Johnny" Johnson (12 February 1884 – 20 April 1966) was a British stamp dealer and philatelist who was a key figure in the early years of the Junior Philatelic Society (subsequently to become the National Philatelic Society) and a close colleague of Fred Melville.

== Organised philately ==
A larger-than-life figure, Johnson earned the nickname "the dynamo" for his energetic efforts in organised philately. He was chief organiser of the Imperial Stamp Exhibition, 1908, the Jubilee International Exhibition, London 1912 and Secretary of the International Exhibition, London 1923.

Johnson joined the J.P.S. in 1900, aged 16, and remained a member until his death. During this time he occupied most of the offices of the society, including Exchange Superintendent, Secretary, Treasurer, Vice President and President. The success of the J.P.S. in its early years has been attributed to the partnership between Melville as propagandist and writer, and Johnson as businessman and organiser.

In 1907, Johnson was a founder member of the Philatelic Literature Society.

Johnson was a fixture at the society's headquarters at 44 Fleet Street, London, as well as in local taverns, and he claimed that he was known to every cab driver in London.

== Publishing ==
Although Johnson published little of his own work, he was well known as a knowledgeable philatelist and he greatly assisted Dr Harry Osborne with his masterful British Line-Engraved Stamps - Twopence Blue, Studies of Plates 1 to 15 and J.B. Seymour with Stamps of Great Britain, parts I & II. He was also the publisher of the J.P.S.'s journal Stamp Lover as well as numerous philatelic books.

== Selected publications ==
- "Brunei, 1907–1924; a study of vignette plate 1" in Stamp Collectors' Coronation Annual.
- Circular Delivery Companies Stamps, Part 4. With Fred Melville & Bertram McGowan.
