= Edward Loines Pemberton =

Stamp dealer and philatelist (1844–1878)

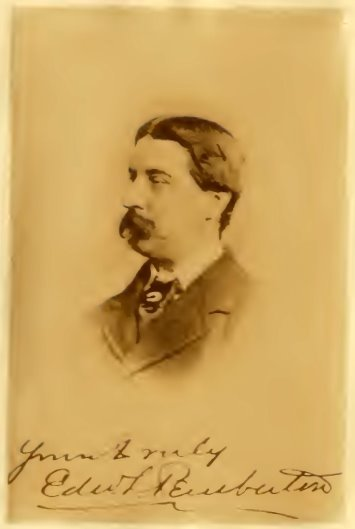
Edward Loines Pemberton

Edward Loines Pemberton (10 December 1844 – 12 December 1878) was a pioneering philatelist and stamp dealer who was a leading advocate of the scientific (or French) school of philately and a founding member of The Philatelic Society, London, now The Royal Philatelic Society London. Pemberton was entered on the Roll of Distinguished Philatelists in 1921 as one of the fathers of philately. He was born in New York City but educated in Britain by relatives when his parents died shortly after his birth. His son, Percival Loines Pemberton (1875-1949) was also an eminent philatelist.

== Scientific philately ==
In the 1860s Pemberton advocated the study of all aspects of stamp production including paper, watermark, printing and perforation. This was known as the scientific or French school. By contrast, the English school advocated that only the actual printed design mattered and that every other aspect of a stamp should be ignored. Some English collectors even advocated cutting the perforations from stamps before mounting so that there was no difference between a perforated and imperforate stamp in the album. At the time, the matter of how exactly to collect stamps had not been settled and the triumph of scientific philately over the simpler English methods lead directly to the sophisticated philatelic methods used today. Pemberton's 1867 Catalogue of the Very Fine and Very Complete Collection of Postage Stamps Selected with Great Care by E.L. Pemberton, Esq. Of Birmingham exemplified this approach.

== Forgeries ==
As an advocate of scientific collecting, it was natural that Pemberton would take a keen interest in forgeries and be well equipped to distinguish the fake from the real. In 1863 he wrote, with Thornton Lewes, Forged Stamps: How to Detect Them and with W. Dudley Atlee he started The Spud Papers, a series of regular articles about forgeries that was continued by the Reverend R.B. Earée after Pemberton's death.

In 1872, when John Walter Scott held the first stamp auction in Europe, Pemberton provided one of the first expert reports on the genuineness of two 20 cent St. Louis Postmaster Provisional stamps which were considered by many to be forgeries.

== Philatelic journalism ==
Pemberton was an active contributor to many philatelic journals, including The Stamp-Collector's Magazine and The Philatelist. He was editor of The Stamp-Collector's Review and Monthly Advertiser from January 1864. In 1872 he started The Philatelical Journal, dedicated to advanced philately, which was the house organ of his stamp dealing firm James R. Grant and Co. The Philatelic Record, edited by Maitland Burnett, was founded in 1879 in Pemberton's memory.

== Stamp dealing ==
Pemberton's first advertisement as a stamp dealer appeared in the Boys Own Magazine in October 1862. In 1869, Adelaide Fenton recorded that William Dudley Atlee was Pemberton's clerk. In 1871 Pemberton formed the stamp company James R. Grant and Co. After his death his business was taken over by A.H. Wilson, and continued under the name of Pemberton, Wilson & Co. It was eventually acquired by Theodor Buhl.

== Publications ==
- Forged stamps: how to detect them, containing accurate descriptions of all forged stamps. Edinburgh: 1863. (With Thornton Lewes)
- Catalogue of the Very Fine and Very Complete Collection of Postage Stamps Selected with Great Care by E.L. Pemberton, Esq. Of Birmingham. Hartlepool: James J. Woods, 1867.
- The Spud Papers. In various journals 1871-1881.
- The Philatelical Catalogue: Being a Complete Catalogue of Postage Stamps, and Postal Envelopes and Cards with Voluminous Notes on Reprints, Forgeries, and Every Subject of Interest (containing upwards of 1100 heliotype illustrations). Dawlish: 1874.
- The Stamp Collectors' Handbook. Southampton, 1874. (2nd edition 1878)

== See also ==
- Percival Loines Pemberton
