= Edward Stanley Gibbons =

English stamp dealer (1840–1913)

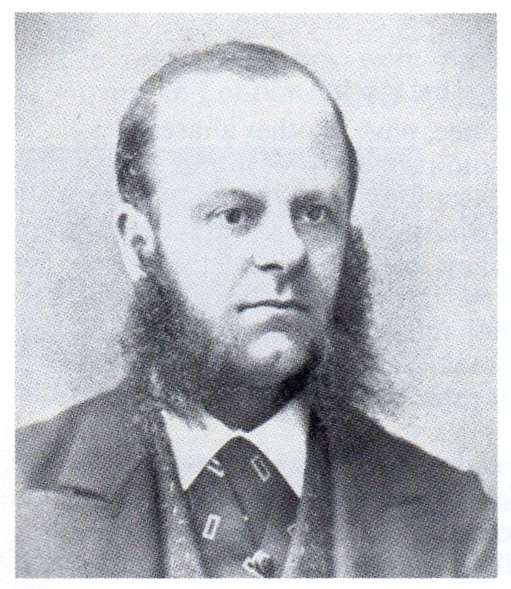
Stanley Gibbons, the founder of the Gibbons catalogue and stamp dealers of the same name.

Edward Stanley Gibbons (21 June 1840 – 17 February 1913) was an English stamp dealer and founder of Stanley Gibbons Ltd, publishers of the Stanley Gibbons stamp catalogue and other stamp-related books and magazines.

== Early life ==
Edward Stanley Gibbons was born at his father William Gibbons' chemists shop at 15 Treville Street, Plymouth, on 21 June 1840, in the same year that the United Kingdom issued the Penny Black, which was the world's first postage stamp. Edward’s interest in postage stamps began whilst at Halloran's Collegiate School. Gibbons, who was a member of The Plymouth Institution (now The Plymouth Athenaeum), owned a book containing stamps for exchange. These stamps included the Western Australia 1d. black and a 1d. "Sydney View" of New South Wales.

Edward left school at the age of 15 and worked for a short while in the Naval Bank, Plymouth, before joining his father's business after the death of his elder brother. William Gibbons encouraged his son's hobby and allowed him to set up a stamp desk in the shop.

Between 1861 and 1871 Gibbons was developing his own stamp business, although there is no evidence to suggest that he had advertised prices prior to 1864. In 1867, Edward's father died and Edward took over the business. However, by this time he was heavily involved in stamp dealing and the pharmaceutical business his father had left him was sold.

== Stanley Gibbons & Co. ==
On 29 January 1872, Edward (also known as Stanley) married Matilda Woon. Two years later, Gibbons decided to move to London to develop his stamp business and relocated to 25 The Chase, Clapham Common (South London). He employed women to tear up sheets of stamps in the evening from this address. Neighbours became curious of the number of women entering the premises and reported it to the local Watch Committee, however they investigated and concluded that nothing unusual was happening there.

Gibbons moved to Gower Street (London) in 1876. Gibbon's first wife, Matilda, died on 11 August 1877 in Devon from a wasting disease, marasmus. The Post Office Directory lists the main occupier of the Gower Street property as 'Stanley Gibbons & Co publishers' or 'Stanley Gibbons & Co postage stamp dealers'. In 1887, Gibbons married his assistant and housemaid, Margaret Casey and in 1890, sold his business to Charles Phillips of Birmingham for £25,000 and retired. (It had first been offered to Theodor Buhl for £20,000.) In 1891, Phillips opened a shop at 435 The Strand, as well as keeping the office at 8 Gower Street.

In 1892, two years after he had retired from business, Stanley bought the property "Cambridge Villa" in Cambridge Park, East Twickenham. It was an impressive residence in a fashionable area of suburban London, near the banks of the Thames, alongside Marble Hill House (built by George II for one of his mistresses). Gibbons lived there until 1911. The house was demolished in 1960.

== Overseas trips ==
During Gibbons' retirement he made numerous trips overseas, mostly for pleasure, but also for business, buying stamps for his old company. A scrapbook was discovered belonging to either him or someone close to him; it contained photographs and memorabilia. It related mostly to his travels. The scrapbook became divided, half of it is kept in the Society of Genealogists archive and the other half is in private hands.

In 1894, Gibbons witnessed the crash of the Orient Express at Tirnove in Bulgaria. A pencil drawing of the crash appears in his scrap book. A newspaper cutting headed "Honolulu, January" was also found in the scrapbook, referring to a resolution to burn stocks of obsolete Hawaiian stamps. Gibbons was present at the fire and described the experience as "sad". During this time, he was on his second world tour and was en route to Japan.

Margaret died on 23 November 1899 of cirrhosis and a few years after her death, Gibbons was in Calcutta and Rangoon. The scrapbook contains a duplicate passport issued at Rangoon in December 1901 for a Mrs Gibbons, his third wife, Georgina. In 1903, Gibbons was in Ceylon. The Society of Genealogists archive contains a newspaper article titled Reminiscences of a Stamp Collector - Mr Stanley Gibbons (sic) in Colombo. The cutting is not dated, but is presumably from 1903 as it refers to the recent issue of stamps with King Edward VII’s portrait.

When asked around this time if he still collected stamps, Gibbons replied that he had specialised collections in six countries, but rarely bought any stamps because they were too expensive. Further visits seem to have been made to Ceylon judging by the existence in the scrapbook of souvenirs for Colombo Empire Day Celebrations and Edward VII’s Birthday Celebration Dinner in Colombo (November 1906).

== Death ==
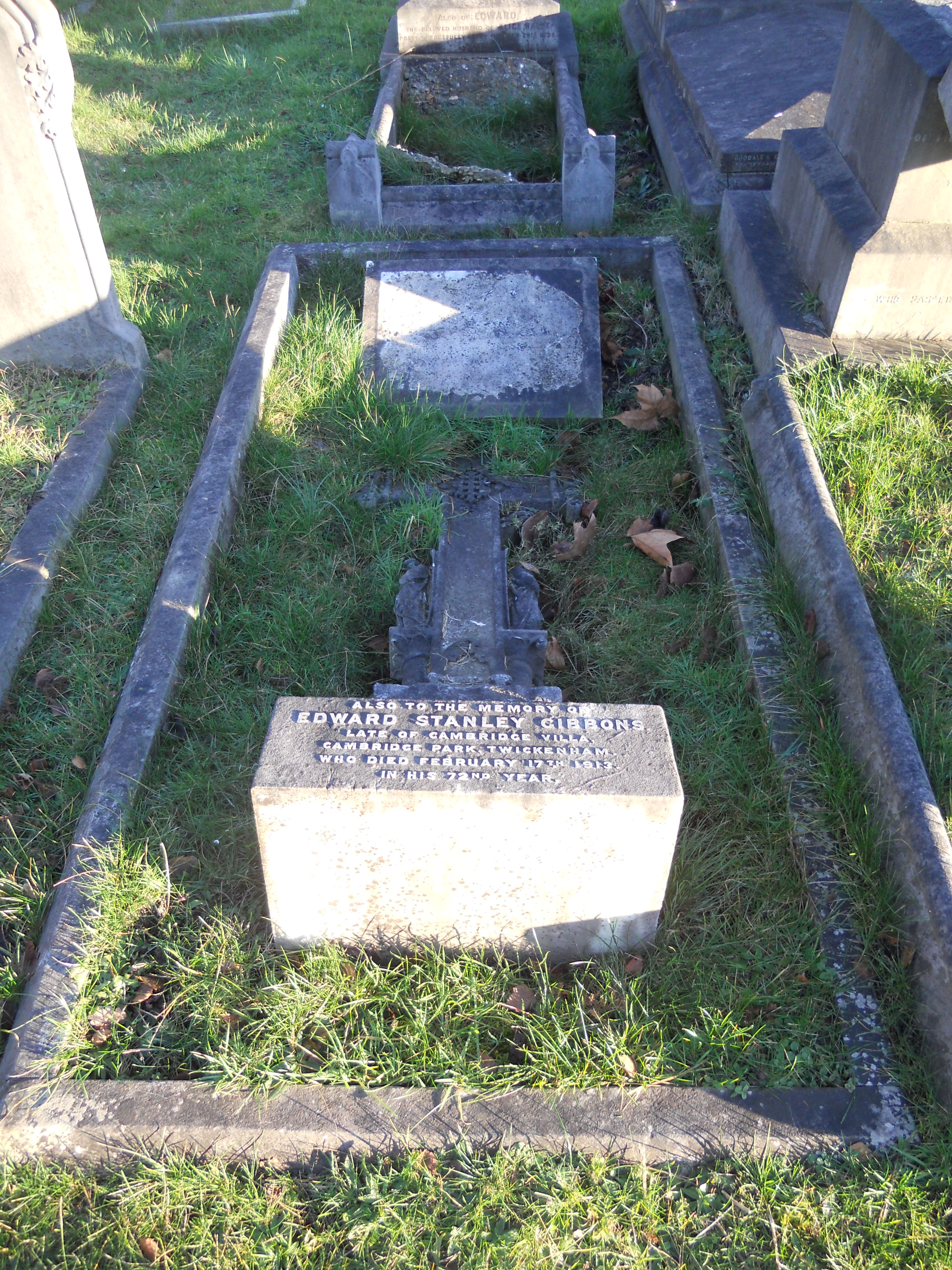
Grave of Gibbons in Twickenham Cemetery in 2014

By 1905, Georgina Gibbons had died, and Stanley married again in October 1905. His fourth wife was Bertha Barth. In 1908, Gibbons was back in Ceylon and in the archives there is a newspaper cutting headed "Death of Lady Visitor to Ceylon: Wife of famous collector". This refers to Bertha, who had died in the General Hospital there from cancer of the liver at 35 years old.

Gibbons returned to England shortly after the death of his fourth wife. On 16 January 1909, he married Sophia Crofts. However, it is possible that he and Sophia separated before his death in 1913 as his will makes no mention of her. Made in July 1912, from his address, 'Selsey', 63 Stanthorpe Road, Streatham, his estate is left to 'a dear friend', Mabel Hedgecoe.

Gibbons' death was recorded on 17 February 1913 at his nephew's apartment at Portman Mansions, just off Baker Street, although it was rumoured he had died in the arms of a lover at the Savoy Hotel and was subsequently transported to his nephew's house. His death certificate gives his occupation as "A retired Stamp Collector" and the cause was stated as "Coma, Haemorrhage of the Brain, secondary to Extensive Valvular Disease of the Heart with Atheroma of Endocardium and the Blood Vessels accelerated by enlarged prostate". He is buried in Twickenham cemetery.

Gibbons' string of wives, all but one of whom died relatively young, his swift remarriages, and his background in pharmacy, have given rise to suspicions of ill-doing on his part, but there is no evidence for that.

== See also ==
- Stamp collecting
