= Charles Foot Tayler =

British painter

- Born: 1794; Newport
- Died: 1853 (aged 58–59)
- Occupation: Portrait painter, miniaturist

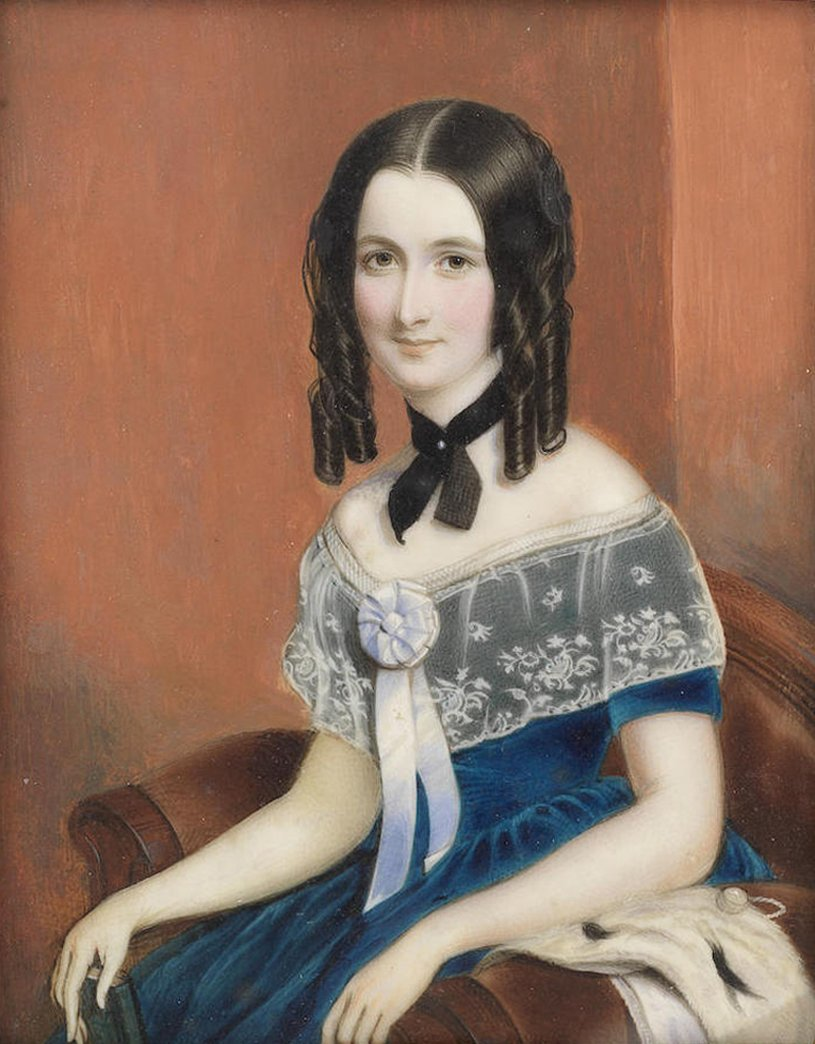
A Young Lady seated in an upholstered armchair

Charles Foot Tayler (1794–1853), sometimes spelled "Taylor", was a painter of portrait miniatures, active on the Isle of Wight and in Bath, England, in the first half of the 19th century.

Taylor was born at Newport on the Isle of Wight. He had at least two brothers, Daniel (1787–1840) and Edward (1804–1869), known from his paintings of them.

He was said to have been exceedingly accurate in his depiction of his sitters. He exhibited 'A portrait of Mr E. Tayler' at the Royal Academy in 1820, and exhibited other works there until the year of his death.

Among his subjects were Adelaide Lucy Fenton, Charles Abel Moysey, Archdeacon of Bath, General Sir Edwin B. Johnson, and General Sir Thomas Hawker KCH.

He married his second wife, Sarah Matilda née Morris, at St Swithin's, Walcot, in 1850. At the time of the 1851 census he was living at 7 Oxford Row, Bath, with Sarah, who was then aged 30, and his children Daniel, aged 18, dentist student; Charly B., aged 15, artist-student; and Katholene [sic] A., aged 4, as well as two servants. Sarah and all the children were born in Bath.

He died aged 55 on 24 July 1853 and is buried in section 5, row 5G of Bath Abbey Cemetery, with his daughter Charlotte Ann Susanna Tayler, who died on 30 May 1845, aged 15; and his (first) wife Ann Tayler, who died on 25 November 1847, aged 36. A 2008 survey noted that the grave's headstone was in a poor state of repair, having delaminated.

Several of his works on ivory are in the collection of the Victoria and Albert Museum, including a portrait of Susan Tayler, bequeathed by the artist's grandson.
