= William Hughes-Hughes =

English barrister

William Hughes-Hughes D.L. (1817 – 7 January 1902) was an English barrister and founding member of The Philatelic Society, London.

== Early life ==
William Hughes-Hughes was born in 1817, and was the son of William Hughes Hughes, a barrister of Lincoln's Inn and Member of Parliament for Oxford. He was educated at Tonbridge School.

Hughes-Hughes matriculated at Christ Church, Oxford, in 1835, graduating B.A. in 1839 and M.A in 1841. He had entered Lincoln's Inn in 1838, and was called to the bar there in 1842.

== Career ==
Hughes-Hughes was a barrister by profession. Later he was a justice of the peace.

== Philately ==
Hughes-Hughes was a founding member of The Philatelic Society, London. which subsequently became the Royal Philatelic Society London, and one of the small group who met regularly at the Rev. Stainforth's Rectory before that society was formed.

He was reported to have become a collector in 1859 and ceased in 1874 having spent £69. His collection was then sold by Stanley Gibbons for £3,000 in 1896. It included a number of rarities:

- British Guiana 1856 4 cents on blue "sugar" paper
- Canada 12d black
- One of the four unused Great Britain Penny Red plate 77 (subsequently sold to Herbert L'Estrange Ewen who sold it to Henry J. Crocker, and believed destroyed in the 1906 San Francisco earthquake or the fire that followed.)
- Cape of Good Hope 4d red Woodblock error of colour (Reckoned to be rarer than a Post Office Mauritius)
- Reunion 1852 15c
- Naples 1860 ½ tornese in both types.

== Death ==
Hughes-Hughes died on 7 January 1902.

== Family ==
Hughes-Hughes married in 1845 Ellen Oldham, daughter of Joseph Oldham of Stamford Hill. Their children included:

- Montague Edward Hughes-Hughes (born 1853), F.S.A. and a member of the Royal Philatelic Society London
- August Hughes-Hughes (born 1857), assistant in the British Museum
- Arthur Lindsay Hughes-Hughes (born 1859), R.N.
