= Henry Haslett =

Henry Haslett (Died 8 November 1916 at Bexley) was one of the small group who met regularly at the Rev. Stainforth's Rectory that formed the nucleus from which The Philatelic Society, London, subsequently The Royal Philatelic Society London, was formed (although Haslett was never a member of that organisation). He may therefore be called one of the first philatelists.

Part collector, part dealer, stamps acquired by Haslett subsequently found their way into the Tapling Collection, which is now part of the British Library Philatelic Collections, and the collection of William Image. Notable stamps acquired by Haslett included Sydney Views and other old colonial stamps. He also acquired early German stamped envelopes.
