= Edward A. Oppen =

Edward Augustus William Oppen was a Prussian-born philatelist who was the creator of one of the first stamp catalogues in English as well as the author of a number of foreign language textbooks. He taught at Haileybury College. In a stamp collecting journal, he was described as a "...classical teacher".

== Postage Stamp Album and Catalogue ==
In January 1863, Oppen published the first edition of his Postage Stamp Album, and Catalogue of British and Foreign Postage Stamps, which combined for the first time a stamp catalogue and stamp album in one book. The publication quickly went through many editions as news of new stamps reached collectors. There were two editions in 1863, and three in 1864–65, all edited by Henry Whymper. A review of the second edition noted that it was "...much improved by that prince of engravers, Henry Whymper."

An 1865 review of the sixth edition recorded that the editor had included, with permission, information from Mount Brown, Dr Gray and Mr Pemberton (presumably E.L. Pemberton). A further twenty-eight editions followed, edited by Charles Viner.

== Selected other publications ==
- A description of the Northern Territory of South Australia: carefully compiled from the various explorers' and surveyors' journals and charts. Hertford: Stephen Austin, 1864.
- French Reader, for the Use of Colleges and Schools, a Graduated Selection from Modern Authors, in Prose and Verse: And Notes, Chiefly Etymological. 1864.
- International German reader: for the use of colleges and schools, and for private reading, containing aids to students. 1866.
- Easy German Reading, After a New System: Being Selections of Historical Tales and Anecdotes. By George Storme, revised by Edward Oppen. 1867.
