= Edwin Beaumont Johnson =

British Army general (1825-1893)

General Sir Edwin Beaumont Johnson GCB CIE
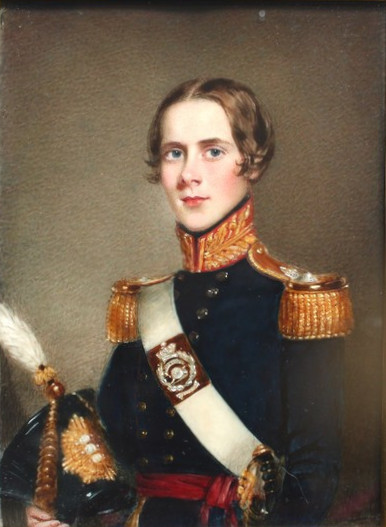
- Portrait miniature by Charles Foot Tayler
- Born: 4 July 1825; Bath, Somerset, England
- Died: 18 June 1893 (aged 67); Kensington, London
- Burial place: Hanwell, London
- Military career
- Allegiance: United Kingdom
- Branch: British Army
- Service years: 1842–1891
- Rank: General
- Conflicts: First Anglo-Sikh War; Second Anglo-Sikh War; Indian Rebellion
- Awards: Knight Grand Cross of the Order of the Bath; Companion of the Order of the Indian Empire

General Sir Edwin Beaumont Johnson GCB CIE (4 July 1825 – 18 June 1893) was a British Army officer who served as Adjutant-General in India.

== Military career ==
Educated at Addiscombe Military Seminary, Johnson was commissioned into the Bengal artillery on 10 June 1842. He fought at the Battle of Ferozeshah in December 1845 and the Battle of Sobraon in February 1846 during the First Anglo-Sikh War as well as the Battle of Chillianwala in January 1849 and the Battle of Gujrat in February 1849 during the Second Anglo-Sikh War. He served as assistant adjutant-general at the Siege of Lucknow in Autumn 1857 during the Indian Rebellion. He became Quartermaster-General in India in July 1873, Adjutant-General in India in March 1874 and a member of the Council of India in October 1874. He went on to be Military Member of the Governor-General of India's Council in March 1877 and Director-General of Military Education at the War Office in December 1884 before retiring in January 1891.

Military offices
Preceded by Frederic Thesiger	Adjutant-General, India; March 1874 – September 1874	Succeeded by Peter Lumsden
