= Walter Dorning Beckton =

British philatelist

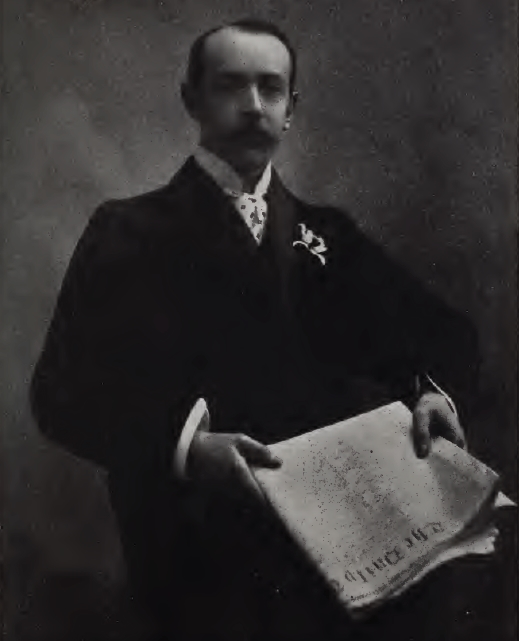
Walter Dorning Beckton

Walter Dorning Beckton (1866 – 17 or 18 March 1931) was a British philatelist who signed the Roll of Distinguished Philatelists in 1921. He was a Manchester solicitor by profession in the firm of Hockin, Beckton & Hockin.

== Collecting ==
Beckton began to collect stamps as a boy in 1879. Greece and Italy were two of his particular interests and in competitive philately he won medals for his Greece, Straits Settlements, Japan, British West Indies, and Romania. He won the Lindenberg Medal in 1931.

== Organised philately ==
Beckton was one of the Manchester school of philately which advocated the scientific study of all aspects of stamp production including paper, watermark, printing and perforation. He was president of the Manchester Philatelic Society for thirty-five years consecutively. He joined The Royal Philatelic Society London in February 1892, eventually becoming president of that society from 1929 until his death in 1931. He was also vice-president of the International Philatelic Union. He wrote extensively on philately and was a regular contributor to the Philatelic Journal of Great Britain and other philatelic periodicals.

== Legacy ==
Beckton's death was unexpected, reportedly from "angina pectoris", over the night of 17–18 March 1931 while he was still president of the Royal. He was survived by a sister and brother. His collection of philatelic literature of over 900 volumes was donated to the Manchester public library in 1934 where it is still available as the Beckton Philatelic Library. His collection of Greece was auctioned by H.R. Harmer in two sales of 1935 and 1936.

== Selected publications ==
- The Stamps of Greece. Plymouth: W. Brendon and Son, 1897. (with G. Duerst)
- Philatelic Nomenclature as Applicable to Lithographed Postage Stamps, 1928. (Paper given at the Philatelic Congress of Great Britain).

Selected papers and articles reprinted from The London Philatelist:

- British Honduras: The Local Surcharges of January 1888. Plymouth: Mayflower Press, 1925.
- The Carlist Stamps of Spain & Further note on the reprints. c.1927.
- Italy – The 15 Centesimi of May 1863. 1928.

== See also ==
- Percival Loines Pemberton
