= Philatelic Literature Society =

The Philatelic Literature Society (1907–1918) was a society to promote the cause of philatelic literature among philatelists at a time when information about philately could be hard to obtain and philatelic books expensive.

== Formation ==
The first meeting of the society was on 29 October 1907 at St.Bride's Institute in London and Edward Denny Bacon, later a President of the Royal Philatelic Society London, was appointed its first President. He remained in that post until 1914. The founding Vice-President was B.T.K. Smith, the Hon. Secretary and Treasurer was F.J. Peplow and the ordinary members were H. Clark, Johnny Johnson, Fred Melville and H.E. Weston.

== Works ==
One of the most important works of the Society was a catalogue of the Crawford Library, written by Bacon, titled The Catalogue of the Philatelic Library of the Earl of Crawford, K.T., a work which won a Large Gold medal at the Postwertzeichen Ausstellung stamp exhibition in Vienna in 1911. A supplement to the catalogue was published in 1926 by the PLS and an addenda in the March 1938 edition of The London Philatelist, both by Bacon.

== Journal ==
A journal was published, titled simply the Journal of the Philatelic Literature Society. Only one hundred copies of each issue were printed.

== Demise ==
The society was disbanded in 1918 and, despite attempts to revive it, was dissolved in 1929.
