= Joseph Speranza =

Joseph Speranza (born 4 February 1840) was a British army officer who joined the Royal Malta Fencibles Artillery at a young age and rose to be its Colonel. He was also one of the founders of the Philatelic Society, London, which later became The Royal Philatelic Society London.

On 2 December 1926, Major J.E. Speranza presented to the Royal Philatelic Society the original pages of their meetings of April, May, and October, 1869, together with two photographs of his father, one probably taken on 13 April 1869. In recognition of this gift, Major J.E. Speranza was elected an honorary fellow of the society.
