= Royal Philatelic Society London Meeting Handouts Collection =

The Royal Philatelic Society London Meeting Notes Collection is a collection of notes and papers from meetings of the Royal Philatelic Society London from 1950 onwards. The collection forms part of the British Library Philatelic Collections.
