= Thomas Hawker (British Army officer) =

British Army officer

General Sir Thomas Hawker KCH
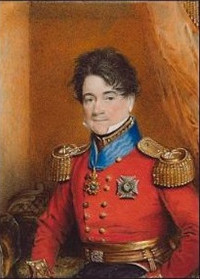
- Portrait miniature by Charles Foot Tayler, 1821
- Born: 1777
- Died: 13 June 1858 (aged 80–81) Clifton, Bristol
- Buried: Rowland's Castle, Hampshire
- Allegiance: United Kingdom
- Branch: British Army
- Service years: 1795–1858
- Rank: General
- Commands: 20th Light Dragoons
- Conflicts: French Revolutionary Wars; Anglo-Russian invasion of Holland; Napoleonic Wars; Peninsular War; Battle of Castalla; Battle of Ordal
- Awards: Mentioned in dispatches

General Sir Thomas Hawker KCH (1777 – 13 June 1858) was a British Army cavalry officer. Hawker began his career in the 11th Light Dragoons in 1795 and fought with them during the 1799 Anglo-Russian invasion of Holland. In 1804, he purchased the rank of major with the 20th Light Dragoons and served with them in Spain during the Peninsular War. He was promoted to command of the regiment in 1808. Hawker served in the force sent to occupy the Republic of Genoa in 1814 and shortly after was promoted to colonel and given command of a light cavalry brigade. Spending some time on half pay after the end of the Napoleonic Wars he returned to active service as lieutenant-colonel of the 13th Light Dragoons. Hawker was in the East Indies between 1822--26 and 1830-36 and was promoted to major-general in 1825. He was appointed a Knight Commander of the Royal Guelphic Order in 1837 and colonel of the 6th Regiment of Dragoon Guards in 1839. Hawker was promoted to the brevet rank of general in 1854.

== Military career ==
Born in 1777, Hawker entered the British Army on 16 May 1795 when he was commissioned as a cornet in the 11th Light Dragoons. He was promoted to lieutenant on 9 April 1796 and captain on 10 July 1799. Hawker fought in the Anglo-Russian invasion of Holland in 1799. On 25 December 1800 he was appointed a captain in the Tower Hamlets Militia and in 1803 was appointed an aide-de-camp to William Cathcart, 1st Earl Cathcart who was Commander-in-Chief in Ireland. On 1 December 1804, he purchased the rank of major in the 20th Light Dragoons with which he served in the Mediterranean and Spain during the Peninsular War from 1805 to 1814. Hawker was promoted to lieutenant-colonel on 3 September 1808. Hawker later recounted that the most successful cavalry charge he was ever part of occurred during this war. A French cavalry regiment entered within carbine range and loosed a volley, upon which Hawker commanded his regiment to charge with the sabre. They reached the French unit before they were able to reholster their carbines and inflicted large numbers of casualties. This anecdote was discussed in an 1879 report on cavalry tactics in the journal of the Royal United Services Institution as part of an argument that the use of carbines by cavalry "on the field of battle is nothing short of insanity".

Accompanying the expedition to the Gulf of Genoa in April 1814, Hawker was given the brevet rank of Colonel in June and given command of the light cavalry brigade; in 1815 the brigade joined an Anglo-Austrian force intended to depose Joachim Murat, the King of Naples, but the mission was abandoned after Murat's defeat. After the Napoleonic Wars he spent some time on half pay before returning to the army, on 9 August 1821, as lieutenant-colonel of the 13th Light Dragoons. Hawker served in a command position in the East Indies between 1822 and 1826 and was promoted to the rank of major-general on 27 May 1825. Hawker was promoted to the rank of lieutenant-colonel in the 2nd Royal Tower Hamlets Militia on 7 June 1825. He held positions in the Madras Presidency between 1830 and 1836. During this time he was appointed to a commission investigating the causes of the Mysore (or Nagar) Rebellion of 1830–31. The commission's report was published on 12 December 1833 and criticised the taxation regime of the local Indian ruler.

Hawker was appointed a Military Knight Commander of the Royal Guelphic Order (KCH) in March 1837. He was appointed Colonel of the 6th Regiment of Dragoons Guards on 20 June 1839 and was brevetted to General in June 1854. Hawker died at his home in Clifton, Bristol on 13 June 1858. The library of the University of Nottingham holds a collection of his correspondence. A portrait of Hawker in 20th Light Dragoons uniform and his insignia of the Guelphic Order are in the collection of the National Army Museum, having been acquired in the 1950s – the rarity of the uniform and insignia being of interest. The insignia itself is also held in the museum's medal collection.

== Personal life ==
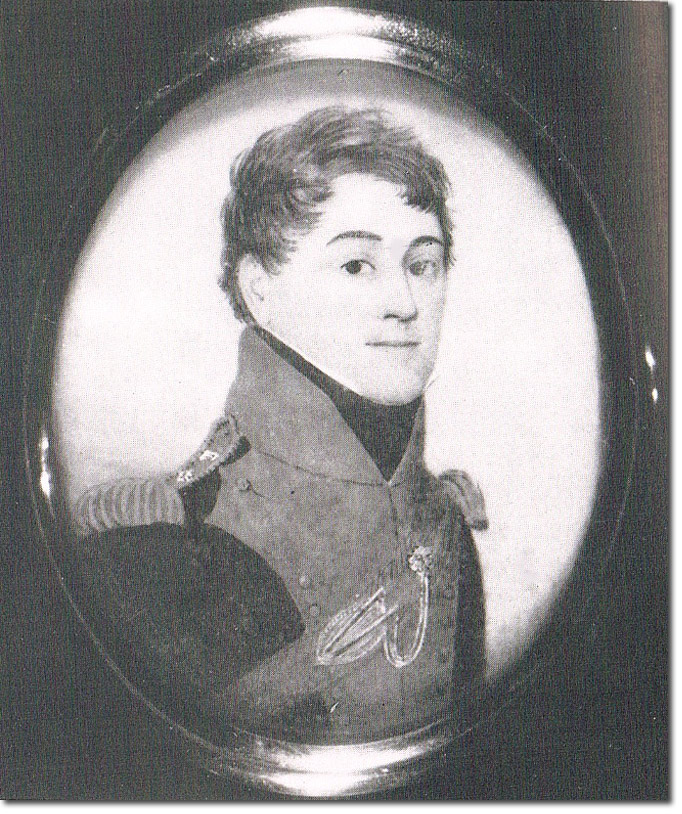
Portrait of Hawker as Colonel of the 20th Light Dragoons in 1812–13

Hawker married Anna Maria, a daughter of James Harrison, Esq. in 1818. A monument in St Mary the Virgin's Church, Bathwick in Somerset, records the death of Hawker's first wife, "who died at sea on her return from India, March 21st 1836". Hawker had at least three sons from the marriage: the Reverend John Hawker, a vicar at Redhill, Hants; Lieutenant Thomas Jones Hawker of the 70th (Surrey) Regiment of Foot who died in the West Indies in 1839 and Francis Richard Hawker, who served as a captain in his father's regiment (the 6th Dragoon Guards) and died in Havant in 1855.

In 1838 he married the eldest daughter of William Woodley, the widow of Frederick Noel, a Royal Naval captain. This second marriage was at St George's Church, Hanover Square in London. His second wife survived him. By 1856 he was resident at Lansdown Crescent, Bath.

Military offices
Preceded by Robert Taylor	Colonel of the 6th Regiment of Dragoons Guards; 1839–1858	Succeeded by Sir Alexander Kennedy Clark-Kennedy
