= National Philatelic Society =

British association for the study of postage stamps and history

- Abbreviation: NPS
- Nickname: The National
- Formation: 1899
- Founder: Fred Melville
- Founded at: Clapham, South London
- Type: Nonprofit philatelic society
- Headquarters: London, United Kingdom
- Region served: National (Great Britain)
- Services: Philatelic library; expertising assistance
- Key people: Herbert "Johnny" Johnson (Co-founder)
- Publication: Stamp Lover (since 1908)
- Website: www.ukphilately.org.uk/nps/
- Formerly called: The Junior Philatelic Society (1899–1971)

The society logo

The National Philatelic Society is one of two national philatelic societies in Great Britain. The other is the Royal Philatelic Society London.

== History ==
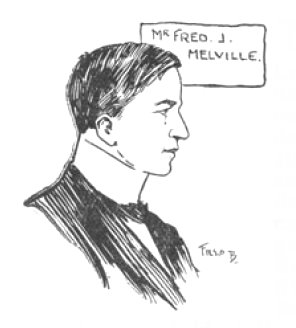
Fred Melville, as pictured in Gibbons Stamp Weekly, February 1905, at the time of the Junior Philatelic Exhibition.

The National, as it is known, was formed in 1899 by Fred Melville and the first meeting is believed to have been at a shop in Clapham, South London. Melville had applied for membership of the Philatelic Society, London, now The Royal Philatelic Society London, but was rejected as he was under 18 years of age. This led to him forming The Junior Philatelic Society (now The National Philatelic Society) that same year.

The society was a huge success, capitalising on pent-up demand for a philatelic society that anyone could join and the new society soon had to seek a larger meeting place. In 1906 Melville formed a Manchester branch of the society. Branches were also formed at Brighton and Liverpool.

The success of the J.P.S. in its early years has been attributed to the partnership between Melville as propagandist and writer, and Herbert "Johnny" Johnson as businessman and organiser.

== Aims ==
The Constitution of the society (1997) states:

The cover of Stamp Lover, the society's magazine.

"The Aims of the Society shall be:

(a) To promote, encourage and contribute to the advancement of the practice of philately in all its branches.
(b) To encourage and undertake the preparation and publication of books, catalogues, guides, journals and papers bearing on philately.
(c) To provide facilities for the practice of philately and to assist and encourage young philatelists.
(d) To encourage the detection and prevention of philatelic fakes, forgeries and spurious material and to give assistance in the prosecution of offenders.
(e) To establish and maintain a permanent centre for philately."

== Today ==
Today the society is still going strong, and continues to hold regular meetings and to publish its journal Stamp Lover, as it has since 1908. The society also has an extensive philatelic library.

== See also ==
- List of philatelic libraries
