= The Stamp-Collector's Magazine =

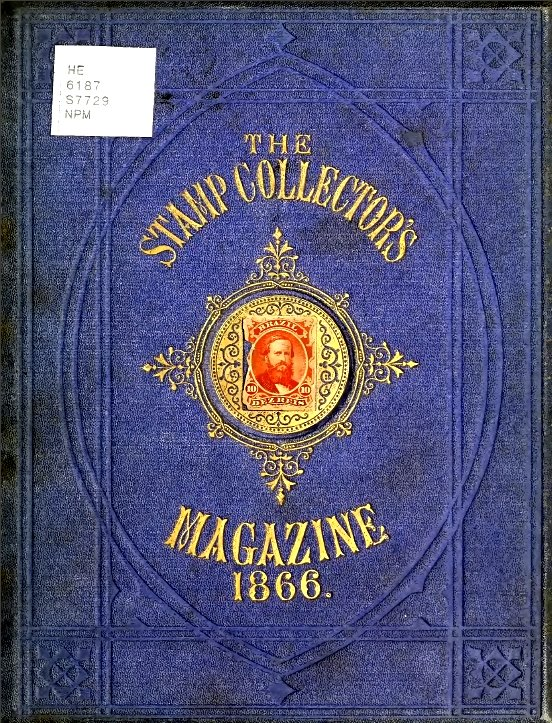
Cover of The Stamp-Collector's Magazine, Vol. 4, 1866, with stamp of Brazil attached. It was the practice of the publishers to paste a stamp to the cover of the bound volumes.

The Stamp-Collector's Magazine was one of the earliest philatelic magazines. It was published in twelve volumes between February 1863 and 1874.

== Contributors ==
Among its regular contributors was the first female philatelist of note, Adelaide Lucy Fenton, who wrote under a variety of pen-names, including Herbert Camoens, the name of a Portuguese poet which she chose partly because it also included the name of the Belgian dealer Jean-Baptiste Moens, Fentonia, Celestina, Virginia and SJV after the name of her home, St. John's Villa in Clifton, Bristol. Bound copies of The Stamp-Collector's Magazine were presented to Miss Fenton by the Editor in gratitude for her contributions and they are now in the library of The Royal Philatelic Society London complete with Miss Fenton's marginal notes.

Peter Anderson, the Scottish philatelist, appeared in the magazine's pages in May 1869, then only about sixteen years of age.

== See also ==
- The Philatelic Record
