= Charles James Phillips =

English philatelist (1863–1940)

- Born: 15 May 1863
- Died: 2 June 1940 (aged 77)
- Engineering career
- Institutions: Collectors Club of New York
- Projects: Purchased Stanley Gibbons & Co.; wrote extensively on philately; sold major stamp collections
- Awards: APS Hall of Fame; Roll of Distinguished Philatelists

Charles James Phillips (15 May 1863 – 2 June 1940) of London, England, and New York City, was a philatelist highly regarded in both England where he started his philatelic career and in the United States, where he emigrated to in 1922.

== Philatelic activity in England ==
In 1890 Phillips purchased Stanley Gibbons & Co. for £25,000. It had first been offered to Theodor Buhl for £20,000. Phillips wrote numerous philatelic articles, including those published in The Gibbons Monthly Journal, The Stamp Advertiser and Auction Record and the Gibbons Stamp Weekly where he wrote articles on various collections he had helped build or sold. Eventually, after many changes, the Gibbons in-house journal became Gibbons Stamp Monthly.

== New York City activity ==
In 1922 Phillips sold the Stanley Gibbons business and emigrated to the United States, establishing his headquarters in New York City. There he continued his practice of selling stamps to help collectors build up their unique collections. During the Great Depression in 1933, he helped arrange for the sale the Arthur Hind collection of rare and classic United States and Confederate States of America stamps and, despite fears by observers that the sale would go badly, the sale of the collection actually brought results far greater than expectations.

Phillips wrote numerous articles on stamp collecting, especially in Stamps and in Philatelic Classics, which was his own journal. Many of these articles dealt with famous members of the stamp collecting community and are of a historic nature. Phillips also wrote and published a number of books on philately, including: The Duveen Collection of Rare Old Postage Stamps: a Brief Description of Some of the Rarities of this Famous Collection, published in 1922, and Denmark 1851–1899: Detailed, Descriptive, Priced Catalogue of the Early Issues, Together with Lists and Prices of the Numeral Cancellations, published in 1925. He also wrote, in 1936, a book for the ordinary stamp collector entitled Stamp Collecting: The King of Hobbies and the Hobby of Kings, a book he is most probably remembered for.

== Honors and awards ==
Phillips was one of the initial signers of the Roll of Distinguished Philatelists in 1921. In New York City, he was presented with the Award of Merit by the Collectors Club of New York in 1939 for his career of service to philately. And, in 1941 he was named to the initial list of the American Philatelic Society Hall of Fame.

== See also ==
- Philately
- Philatelic literature
