= Theodor Buhl =

British stamp dealer (1865 - 1922)

Theodor August Buhl
- Born: 1865
- Died: 1922 (aged 56–57)
- Occupation: Stamp dealer

Theodor August Buhl (baptised August Theodor Buhl; 16 May 1865 – 11 October 1922) was a British stamp dealer in London who published Stamp News, which he also edited until 1895.

Buhl was born in Frankfurt, the eldest of six children of music professor/composer Carl Friedrich August Buhl (anglicised to Charles Frederick Augustus Buhl) and Sophie Friederike (Sophia Frederica), née De Barÿ. The family emigrated when he was a small child, settling in Lambeth, London.

In 1890, Buhl was offered the business of Stanley Gibbons, who was retiring, but declined it as too expensive at £20,000. It was subsequently sold to Charles Phillips for £25,000. In 1892, he bought the business of Pemberton, Wilson & Co (London), and with it the rights to The Philatelic Record which he later merged with Stamp News. In the same year he was a witness at the trial of Bernhardt Assmus. Buhl kept a general stock but specialised in the stamps of South America and Messrs. Buhl and Co., Limited sponsored a Gold Medal for the best collection of the stamps of Peru at the London Philatelic Exhibition of 1897.

== Publications ==
- The Stamp News Annual (various years)

== See also ==
- Edward Loines Pemberton
