= All Hallows Staining =

Church in London, England

Coordinates: 51°30′41.68″N 0°4′49.76″W

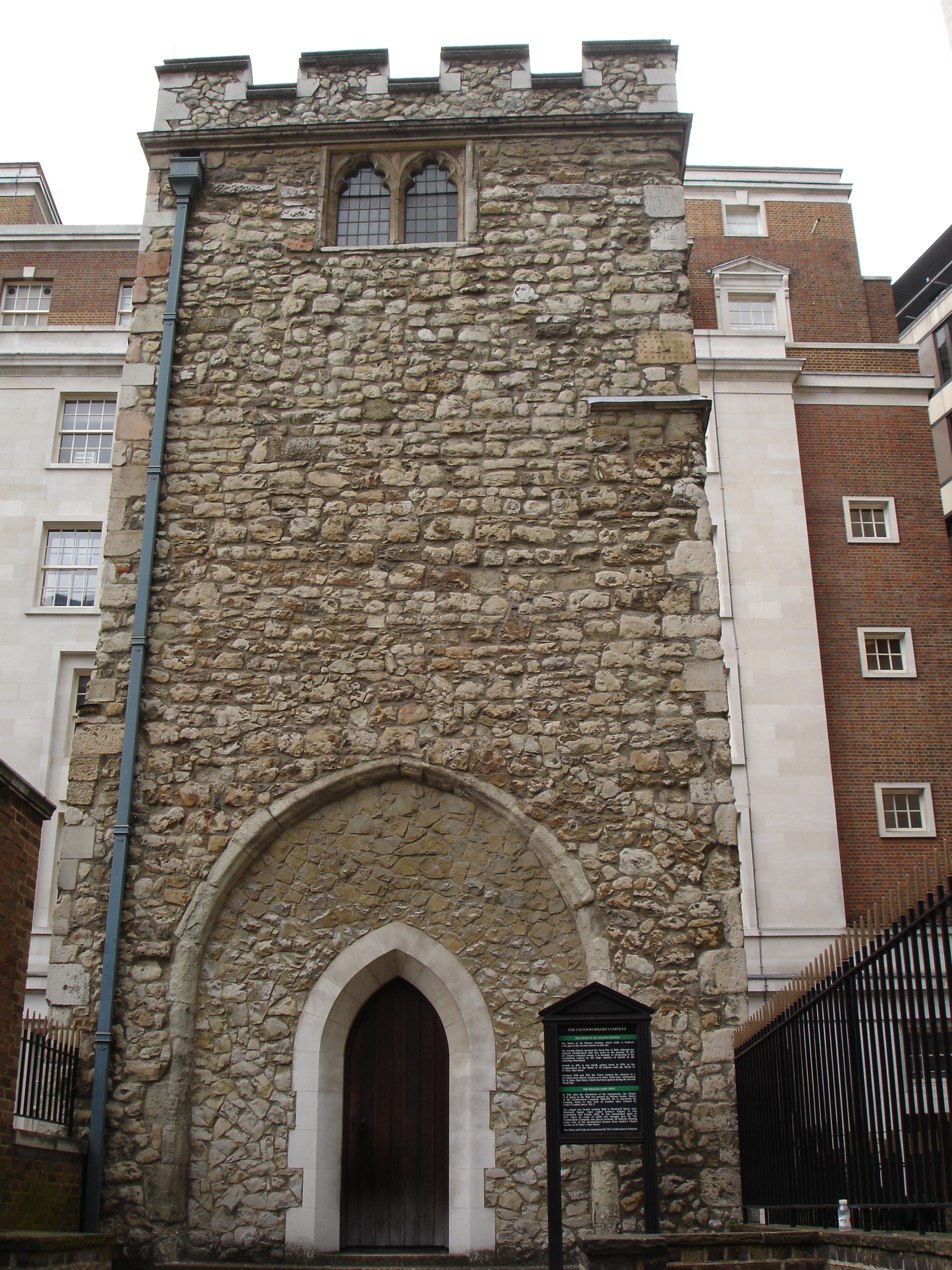
- Remaining tower

- Location within Greater London
- Country: England
- Denomination: Anglican

Allhallows Staining Church Act 2010
- Act of Parliament
- Parliament of the United Kingdom
- Long title: An Act to remove certain restrictions relating to the use of land comprising the former church of Allhallows Staining, its churchyard, and other adjoining land in the City of London; to make provision for the removal of any human remains from the land and to enable its use for other purposes; and for connected purposes.
- Citation: 2010 c. v

Dates
- Royal assent: 27 July 2010

Text of statute as originally enacted

All Hallows Staining was a Church of England church located at the junction of Mark Lane and Dunster Court in the north-eastern corner of Langbourn ward in the City of London, England, close to Fenchurch Street railway station. All that remains of the church is the tower, built around AD 1320 as part of the second church on the site. Use of the grounds around the church is the subject of the Allhallows Staining Church Act 2010 (c. v).

== History ==
The first mention of the church was in the late 12th century. It was named "Staining", which means stone, to distinguish it from the other churches of All Hallows in the City of London, which were wooden.

The old church survived the Great Fire of London in 1666 but collapsed five years later in 1671, leaving only the tower and a small part of the west end. It was thought its foundations had been weakened by too many burials in the churchyard close to the church walls. The church was rebuilt in 1674. A 19th-century account of the rebuilt church describes the interior as "nothing more than a long narrow room, with a simple cornice around the walls". The medieval tower stood at the northwest corner.

Etching, drawn 1922

In 1870, the parish of All Hallows Staining was combined with that of St Olave Hart Street, and All Hallows was demolished, leaving only the tower. The proceeds from the demolition funded the construction of a new church in East End of London, All Hallows, Bow. Since then the tower has been owned and maintained by the Worshipful Company of Clothworkers, one of the livery companies of the City of London, whose hall was adjacent to it.

During the Second World War in 1941, St Olave Hart Street was badly damaged by bombs. Between 1948 and 1954, when the restored St Olave's was reopened, a prefabricated church stood on the site of All Hallows Staining. This was known as St Olave Mark Lane. The tower of All Hallows Staining was used as the chancel of the temporary church.

In 1957 the Clothworkers' Company built a church hall for St Olave Hart Street on the site of All Hallows Staining. The old tower stood at the back of a small courtyard next to the new hall, and the remains of the church were designated a Grade I listed building on 4 January 1950.

== Lambe's Chapel Crypt ==
Until the current redevelopment, the remains of Lambe's Chapel Crypt lay beneath the yard adjacent to the tower. The structure had been moved from the site of Lambe's Chapel in Monkswell Street and rebuilt there in 1872, following the purchase of All Hallows by the Clothworkers Company, which had previously owned the chapel. It is named after William Lamb, once a Master of the company. The reconstruction was only about half the size of the original structure and incorporated a great deal of new material. It was said to have formed part of the Hermitage of St James on the Wall. These remains were designated Grade II at the same time as the main tower.

=== Contemporary description ===
The contemporary historian John Strype wrote in his two-volume work A Survey of the Cities of London and Westminster (1720):

At the North Corner of this Street, on the same side, was sometime an Hermitage or Chappel of St. James, called In the Wall, near Cripplegate. It belonged to the Abbey and Covent of Garadon, as appeareth by a Record, the Seven and twentieth of Edward I. And also by a Record the 16 of Edward III. William de Lions was Hermit there; and the Abbot and Covent of Geredon found two Chaplains, Cestercian [sic] Monks of their House, in this Hermitage: one of them for Aymor de Valence, Earl of Pembrook; and Mary de Saint Paul, his Countess.

Of these Monks, and of a Well pertaining to them, the Street took that Name, and is called Monks Well street. This Hermitage, with the Appurtenances, was in the Reign of Edward VI. purchased from the said King, by William Lambe, one of the Gentlemen of the King's Chappel, Citizen and Clothworker of London. He deceased in the Year 1577. and then gave it to the Clothworkers of London; with other Tenements, to the value of Fifty Pounds the Year; to the intent they shall hire a Minister to say Divine Service there.

== 2025 redevelopment ==
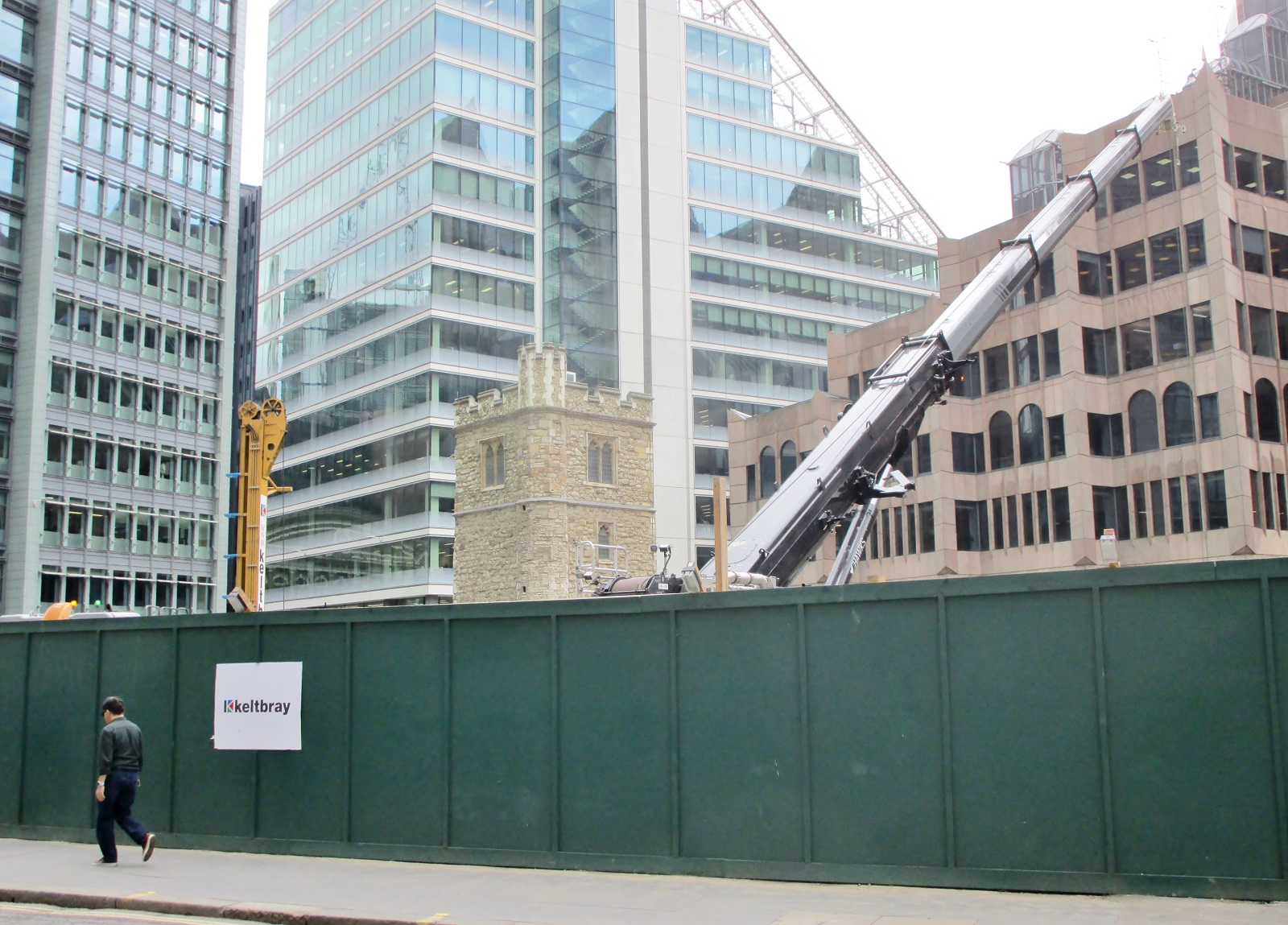
Tiny church tower in the middle of a construction site (2025)

In 2025, the entire city block containing the tower was demolished to make way for the "Fifty Fenchurch Street" high-rise development. This included the Clothworkers' Hall and the parish hall of St. Olave's Church. The project also entails the demolition of the crypt of Lambe's Chapel, with plans for its reconstruction in the basement level of the new 36-story office building. The tower itself is being preserved; it has been underpinned and will rest on supports while the basement levels of the high-rise are being constructed. The planned work on the tower includes the removal of modern infill from the arches on the south and east sides.

== See also ==
- List of churches and cathedrals of London
