= Adelaide Lucy Fenton =

American journalist

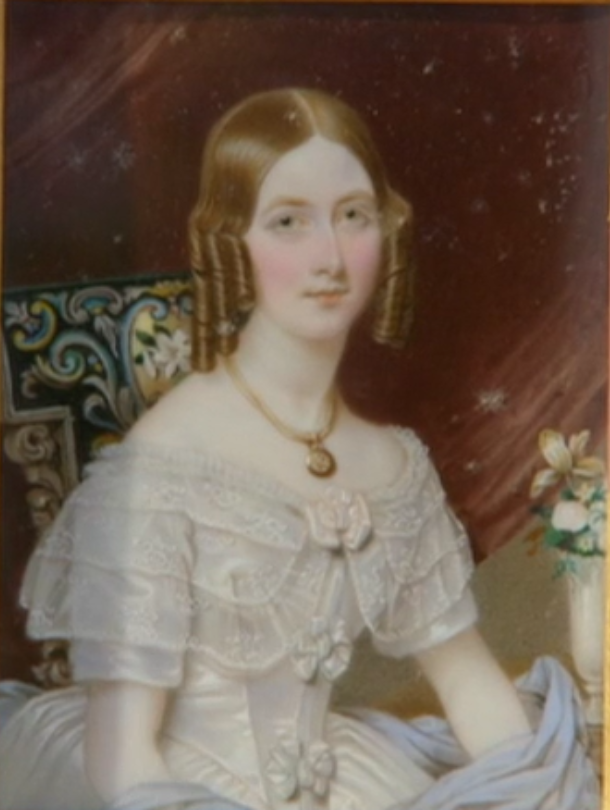
- Portrait in miniature of Fenton at the time of her coming out ball, painted by Charles Foot Taylor
- Born: 1824 or 1825
- Died: 6 February 1897
- Known for: Early female philatelist

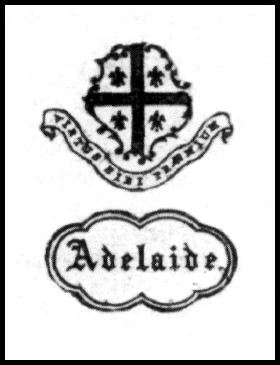
Fenton's personal crest, bearing the Latin motto Virtus Sibi Praemium ("Virtue is its own reward")

Adelaide Lucy Fenton (1824 or 1825 – 6 February 1897) was an early female philatelist and philatelic journalist who was among the first to adopt a scientific approach to philately. Fenton has been called "...the first female philatelist of note".

== Early life ==
Adelaide was born in 1824 or early 1825, the daughter of Captain James John Fenton of the 44th Regiment.

== Scandalous letters ==
In 1859, a Miss Adelaide Lucy Fenton was a party to a legal case brought against Colonel John Alexander Forbes which alleged that he had, on 23 June 1859, "unlawfully and wickedly utter and publish an obscene and indecent letter, with intent to debauch and corrupt Adelaide Lucy Fenton, and with intent to incite her to commit a breach of the peace." The case was widely reported in the press of the day. Miss Fenton was described as "a lady, well known in fashionable circles, and much esteemed in Bath."

Miss Fenton deposed that she was an unmarried lady residing at 3 Montpelier, Bath and not at all acquainted with the defendant. A number of anonymous obscene letters, including drawings, were alleged to have been sent by Forbes to Miss Fenton over several years. Separately, a Mr Llewellyn Watling of London, who had placed an advert seeking a job, had entered into a correspondence with a "Francis York" care of the Post Office, Bath, but the correspondence was broken off by Watling after unpleasant suggestions were made in the letters from Mr York. Eventually both Miss Fenton and Mr Watling separately contacted the police in Bath and by comparing the letters the police were able to confirm that the writer of both sets of letters was the same person. The police were also able to establish that it was Colonel Forbes who picked up the replies at the Post Office. Forbes was bailed but did not appear on the first day of his trial on 11 August 1859.

== Philatelic writing ==
From 1863 Miss Fenton became a prolific contributor to The Stamp-Collector's Magazine and The Philatelist and her contributions were noted for their philatelic scholarship. Her first contribution to the Stamp-Collector's Magazine was a letter published on 1 December 1863 titled "The Bahamas Stamp – Yams versus Shells" and her first article was published on 1 June 1864 titled "The Morality of Postage Stamps".

Miss Fenton wrote under several pen names including Herbert Camoens, the name of a Portuguese poet which she chose partly because it also included the name of the Belgian dealer Jean-Baptiste Moens, Fentonia, Celestina, Virginia and SJV after the name of her home, St. John's Villa in Clifton, Bristol. Bound copies of The Stamp-Collector's Magazine and The Philatelist were presented to Miss Fenton by the editors of those magazines in gratitude for her contributions and they are now in the library of The Royal Philatelic Society London complete with Miss Fenton's marginal notes.

== Fall from a horse ==
In 1865 Miss Fenton was involved in a further court case as a plaintiff when she alleged that she was knocked off her horse and injured by a cart which was driven in a reckless manner. The case was unremarkable and Miss Fenton was awarded £20 damages. It was stated during the case that Miss Fenton lived at St.John's Villa, Lower Harley Place, Clifton, Bristol and previously at Presten Villa. She had been riding for twenty years and kept two horses, one for herself and one for her groom. Following the case, Miss Fenton was in bed for a fortnight and on crutches for four weeks. She stated that as a result of her injuries she was unable to ride and unable to walk for more than half an hour. She had also missed out on archery and croquet.

== Royal Philatelic Society ==
In 1873 Miss Fenton presented a paper to the Philatelic Society, London, now the Royal Philatelic Society London, on "The Secret Marks on the Stamps of Peru" which was subsequently published in The Stamp Collector's Magazine in January 1874. She subsequently joined the society in 1879 although she remained a member for only one season. Correspondence printed in an article by Ron Negus indicates that Miss Fenton resigned due to "discourtesy" by a society officer.

== Death ==
Fenton, who had never married, died on 6 February 1897 at 42 St. John's Villa, Clifton, Bristol. Her effects were disposed of at auction by Messrs. C.H. Tucker & Co. of Bristol on 3 and 4 March 1897 and included several important lots of philatelic literature. A portrait in miniature of Fenton at the time of her coming out ball, painted by Charles Foot Taylor, and one of her dresses, were shown on the BBC Television programme Antiques Roadshow in August 2018.

== See also ==
- Charlotte Tebay

== Selected publications ==
- "The Peruvian Stamps" as Fentonia in The Stamp-Collector's Magazine, 1 June 1865, pp.87–89.
