= Fred Melville =

British philatelist and author (1882–1940)

Frederick John Melville
- Portrait of Melville from the 1930s
- Born: 22 February 1882; Edinburgh
- Died: 12 January 1940 (aged 57); London
- Other names: Fred
- Occupations: Journalist & Philatelic Author
- Known for: Philatelic literature

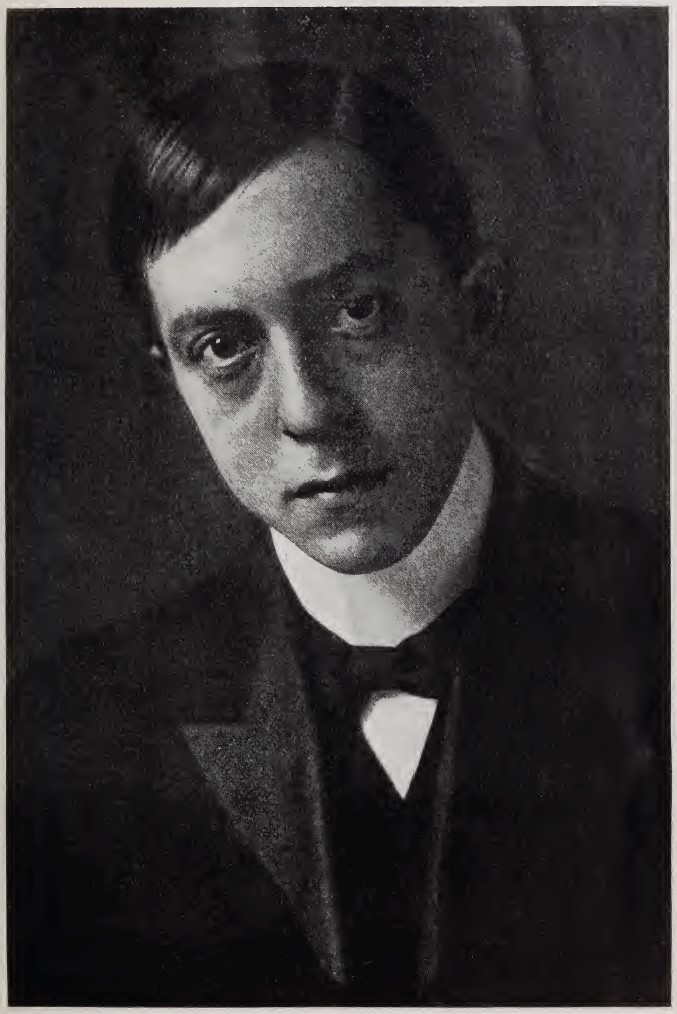
Fred Melville in The Philatelic Record 1908.

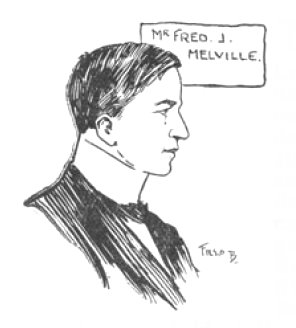
Fred Melville, as pictured in Gibbons Stamp Weekly, February 1905, at the time of the Junior Philatelic Exhibition.

Frederick John Melville (22 February 1882 – 12 January 1940) was a British philatelist, prolific philatelic author and founder of The Junior Philatelic Society. He was also a founder in 1907 of the Philatelic Literature Society. Melville is a member of the American Philatelic Society's Hall of Fame and was a signatory to The Roll of Distinguished Philatelists in 1921.

== Early life ==
Melville was born in Edinburgh in 1882 to Thomas J. Melville and Annie Melville but moved to London at the age of two when his father, who was a journalist, became the House of Commons correspondent for The Scotsman. Fred had brothers Cecil Balfour, Thomas B. and William. He also had sisters Kate and Helen (later Mrs Helen P. Terry).

Fred was educated at Westminster School where he was the instigator of a school magazine The United Westminster School Field Club Magazine. He was always known just as Fred.

As a young boy of just 11 he took his father to an exhibition of stamps organised by the Philatelic Society, London, now The Royal Philatelic Society London at Arundel Street. At that exhibition he met Edward Denny Bacon who handed him a copy of the Society's journal, The London Philatelist.

In 1899 he applied for membership of the Society, but was rejected as he was under 18 years of age. As a result, he formed The Junior Philatelic Society (now The National Philatelic Society) that same year. The society was a huge success, capitalising on pent-up demand for a philatelic society that anyone could join and the new society soon had to seek a larger meeting place. In 1906 Melville formed a Manchester branch of the society. Melville was President of the society from the start until his death and also edited the society's journal The Stamp Lover.

Melville was never in good health and he did not serve in the military during World War One.

== Writing ==
A 1921 advert for the Melville stamp books.

Melville wrote over 100 books and his works are still some of the most common encountered in Philately.

In 1897 he wrote and self-published an eight-page pamphlet called Stamp Collecting, priced at one penny. Fred was so embarrassed with the publication in later years that he bought up every copy that was offered for sale, with the result that it is now a very scarce item. In 1899 he became the editor of the philatelic section of a small journal known as Hardman's Miscellany. Soon afterwards he launched his own magazine, Young Stamp Collector which ran for six issues before merging with Stamp Collectors' Fortnightly. Melville also contributed philatelic articles to The Daily Telegraph, Wide World Magazine, The Straits Times of Singapore, the Illustrated London News and John O'London's Weekly.

His second philatelic book was The A.B.C. of Stamp Collecting (1903), which received a highly complimentary review in Morley's Philatelic Journal where it was praised as being "remarkably free from [the] errors which are so often found in cheap guides to philately" despite having one fault in omitting telegraph and fiscal stamps. A new edition was published in 1922 as The New A.B.C. of Stamp Collecting. His 1908 book Postage Stamps worth Fortunes was translated into Swedish and Dutch and his last book, Modern Stamp Collecting, was published on 6 May 1940, the centenary of the issue of the Penny Black. Melville also edited the Postage Stamp (1909–1929), Stamp Collector's Fortnightly (1921–1939) and British Philatelist (1932–1939). He also wrote, still on a philatelic theme, The Lady Forger: an original play which was published by The Junior Philatelic Society. The play had its first performance in 1906 at the society's annual Concert-Conversazione at the Bijou Theatre, Archer Street, Westbourne Grove, London. According to Brian Birch, Melville used the pseudonym Miss Fitte as a pun on misfit when writing about stamp errors.

Outside philately, Melville was editor of the Heartsease Library, Cosy Corner, Good Words and Sunday Magazine. Melville's skill as a journalist has been partly attributed to the training he received from the press baron Sir Alfred Harmsworth, later Lord Northcliffe, founder of The Daily Mirror and The Mail.

== Organised philately ==
Melville was active in many branches of philately. He was a member of the Fiscal Philatelic Society from 1911 and he served on many philatelic exhibition juries. He won the Congress Cup at the Philatelic Congress of Great Britain in 1935, for his work The Lives of the Forgers and when the Postal History Society was founded in 1936, he was elected as the first President of the society. He appears in the 1938 Blue Book of Philately where his specialism is shown as philatelic literature and his address is given as 10a Ardberg Road, Herne Hill, London.

Melville organised the Imperial Stamp Exhibition of 1908, the War Stamps Exhibition in 1915 and the first international airpost exhibition, APEX, in 1934. He also edited the catalogues for the international philatelic exhibitions held in London in 1912 and 1923. In 1915 an exhibition titled War Stamps with Tango Teas was arranged by Melville at the Florence Restaurant in London. In addition to the stamp exhibition, an orchestra played daily and Melville was reported as being "the only one who braved the intricacies of the Tango, the Boston, and the Maxixe".

Although principally an author and journalist, Melville did also deal in stamps and a full page advert appeared in Stamp Lover in June 1920 offering stamps for sale from the firm of Fred J. Melville Ltd.

== Legacy ==
Melville died at age 57 on 12 January 1940. His funeral took place at Lambeth Cemetery, Tooting, London on 16 January. Fred was not married and was survived by his sister Mrs Helen P. Terry (née Melville). In 1941 he was posthumously inducted into the APS Hall of Fame. After his death, Melville's extensive philatelic library was purchased by the United States Library of Congress but it was not delivered until 1947 due to the effects of World War Two. Today it is split between that library and the library of the National Postal Museum, part of the Smithsonian Institution Libraries.
