= Gibbons Stamp Monthly =

British philatelic magazine

- Gibbons Stamp Monthly
- Editor: Dean Shepherd
- Categories: Philately
- Frequency: Monthly
- First issue: 1890
- Company: Stanley Gibbons
- Country: United Kingdom
- Language: British English
- Website: stanleygibbons.com/gsm

Gibbons Stamp Monthly (GSM) is a British philatelic magazine which can trace its roots back to 1890. GSM is published by the famous stamps and collectables firm of Stanley Gibbons and each issue includes updates to their various catalogues.

== History ==
In 1890, Charles James Phillips bought the business of Stanley Gibbons. Phillips was already producing and editing a philatelic journal called The Stamp Advertiser and Auction Record but that was soon replaced with the new Gibbons Monthly Journal.

In 1905, a new magazine was introduced, Gibbons Stamp Weekly, and in June 1908 the Journal was discontinued. However, producing a quality weekly magazine was too much, and in December 1910, the Weekly ceased and Gibbons Monthly Journal returned from January 1911 until it ceased with the outbreak of war in 1914.

Stanley Gibbons did not produce a journal during the First World War, but in September 1919, Stanley Gibbons Monthly Circular was introduced, which lasted for 49 issues. In October 1923, Stanley Gibbons Monthly Journal returned once again. The new Journal lasted until September 1927, when it was replaced by Gibbons Stamp Monthly from October 1927.

GSM did not close during the Second World War, although it was much reduced in size, and the whole of the May 1941 issue was destroyed by enemy bombing, leading to an "Emergency Issue" being produced. Post-war paper rationing and electricity cuts were also a problem, and the staff sometimes had to work by candlelight.

The first all-colour cover was introduced in September 1963. In 1967 an American sister journal, the Gibbons-Whitman Stamp Monthly, was introduced but this ceased publication in 1969.

In June 1970, the word Gibbons was dropped from the title so that it became just Stamp Monthly but the old name was reinstated in June 1977. Apart from minor changes the magazine has continued in the same format since then.

== Availability ==
The magazine is available from newsagents and by subscription. Online subscribers can access downloadable issues of the magazine via the online archive spanning 2010 to present-day.

== See also ==
- Founder and stamp dealer, Edward Stanley Gibbons
- The firm, Stanley Gibbons
