= The Philatelic Record =

Important early philatelic magazine

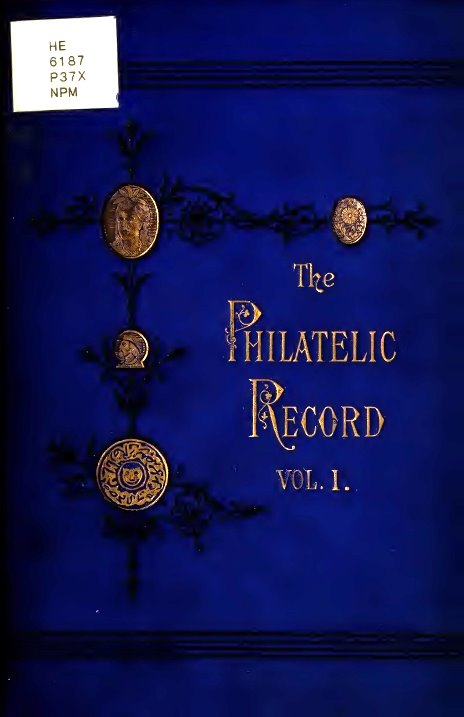
The bound edition of Volume 1 of The Philatelic Record.

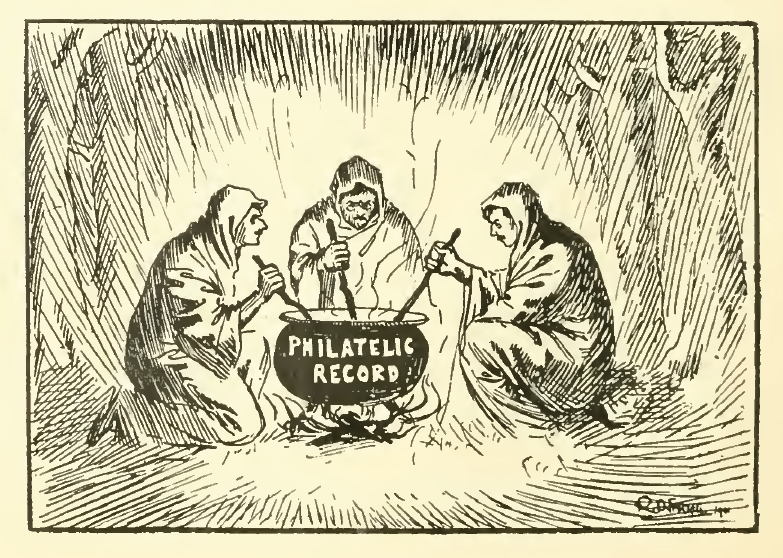
The Philatelic Record staff as imagined by a customer, 1902.

The Philatelic Record was an important early philatelic magazine published in 36 volumes between February 1879 and 1914. It was originally published by Pemberton, Wilson and Company of London and later by Buhl & Company when it was merged with The Stamp News to form The Philatelic Record and Stamp News, under the editorship of Edward J. Nankivell. It reverted to its original title when it was taken over by Sir Isaac Pitman and Sons.

== See also ==
- The Stamp-Collector's Magazine
