= Royal Philatelic Society London =

Learned society in London, U.K., devoted to philately

The Royal Philatelic Society London

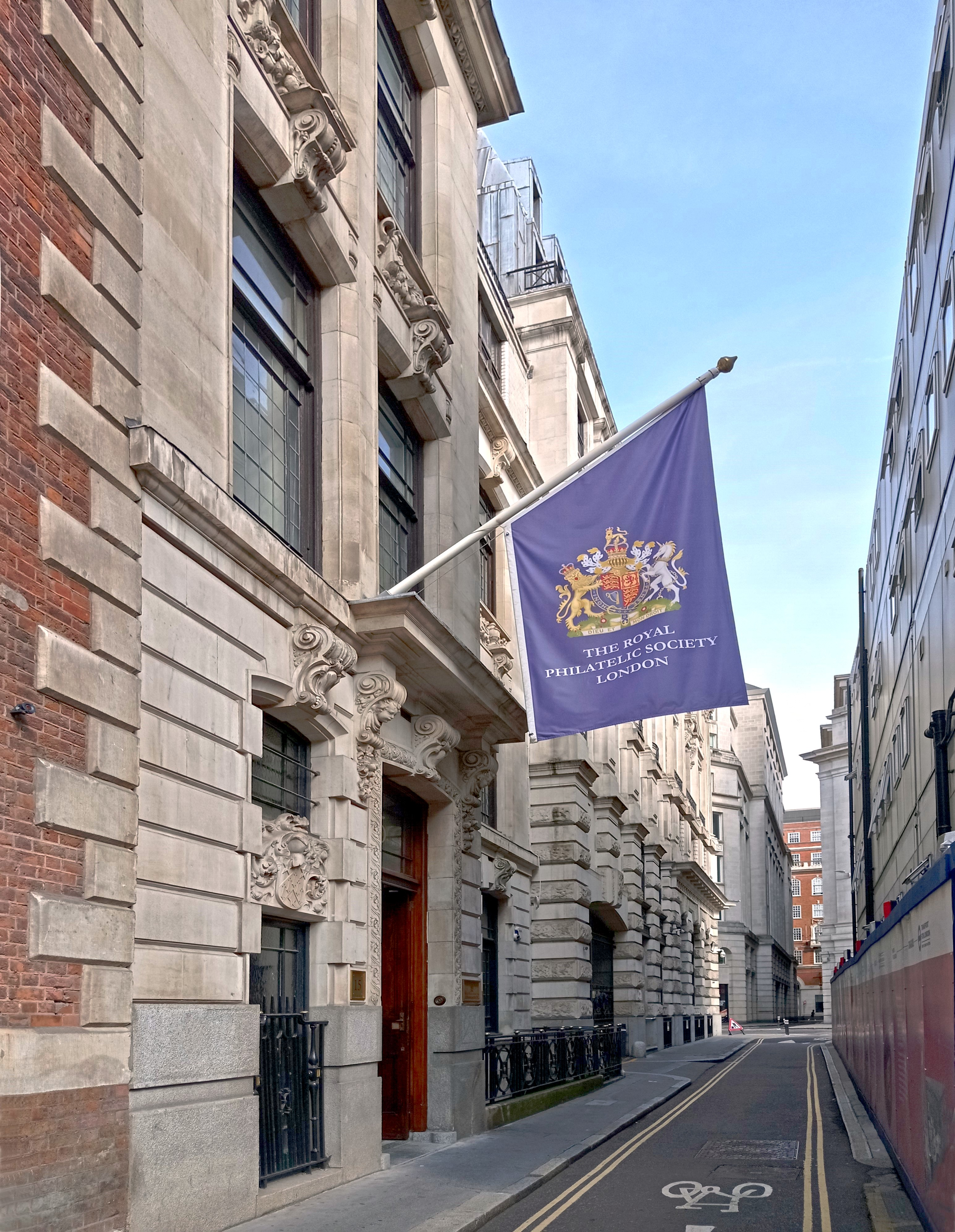
- Premises of the Royal at 15 Abchurch Street
- Abbreviation: RPSL
- Formation: 10 April 1869; 157 years ago
- Type: Learned societies
- Headquarters: 15 Abchurch Lane; London EC4N 7BW UK
- Coordinates: 51°31′17.2″N 0°08′59.1″W
- Fields: Philately
- Members: 2,200 in 80 countries (2017)
- Patron: His Majesty the King
- President: Simon Richards
- Website: www.rpsl.org.uk
- Formerly called: The Philatelic Society, London (1869–1905)

The Royal Philatelic Society London (RPSL) is the oldest philatelic society in the world. It was founded on 10 April 1869 as The Philatelic Society, London. The society runs a postal museum, the Spear Museum of Philatelic History, at its headquarters in the City of London.

== History ==
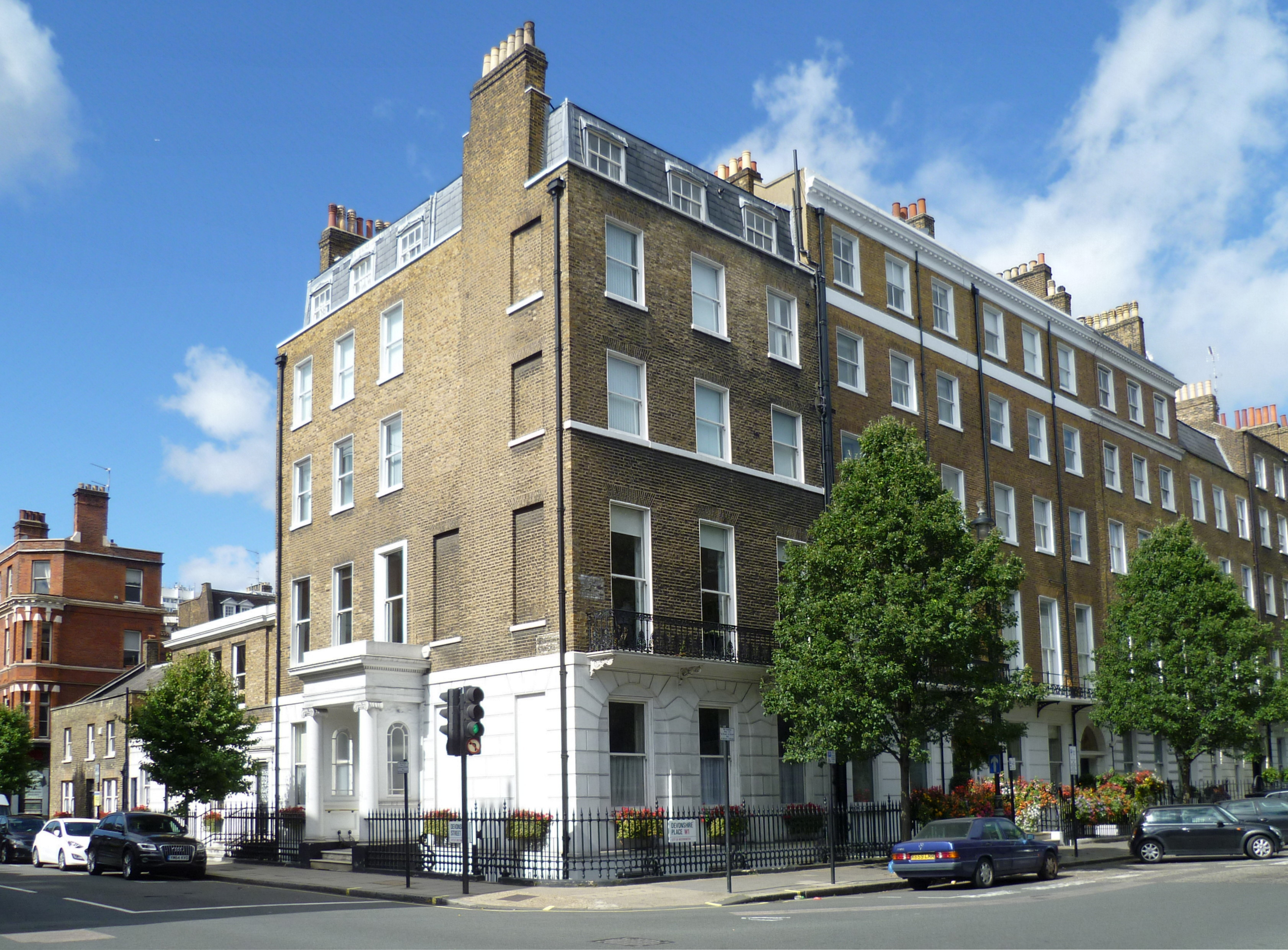
The former premises of the society at 41 Devonshire Place on the corner with Devonshire Street

The society was founded on 10 April 1869 at a meeting at 93 Great Russell Street in the rooms of the stamp dealer J.C. Wilson. The first officers elected were the president, Sir Daniel Cooper, the vice-president, Frederick A. Philbrick, and the secretary, W. Dudley Atlee. The committee comprised Edward Loines Pemberton, Charles W. Viner, Thomas F. Erskine, Joseph Speranza, and W. E. Hayns.

Permission to use the prefix "Royal" was granted by King Edward VII in November 1906.

Prince George, Duke of York (the future King George V), was an enthusiastic stamp collector. He served as honorary vice-president of the society from 1893 to 1910. His father, King Edward VII, had a large stamp collection that he gave to Prince George, which became known as the Royal Philatelic Collection. When he was crowned King, George V stayed with the Society as its royal patron. His second son, King George VI, continued to expand the royal collection.

The former patron was Queen Elizabeth II. Every September, at a special meeting of the society, part of the Royal Philatelic Collection is displayed by its keeper. Queen Elizabeth II was not known to be a philatelist herself, but the royal family has maintained and added to the collection passed down by Edward VII.

The organisation celebrated its 150th anniversary in 2019. The anniversary was marked by a visit from its patron, Queen Elizabeth II, on 26 November 2019 when she opened the Society's new Headquarters in Abchurch Lane, London EC4.

== Membership ==
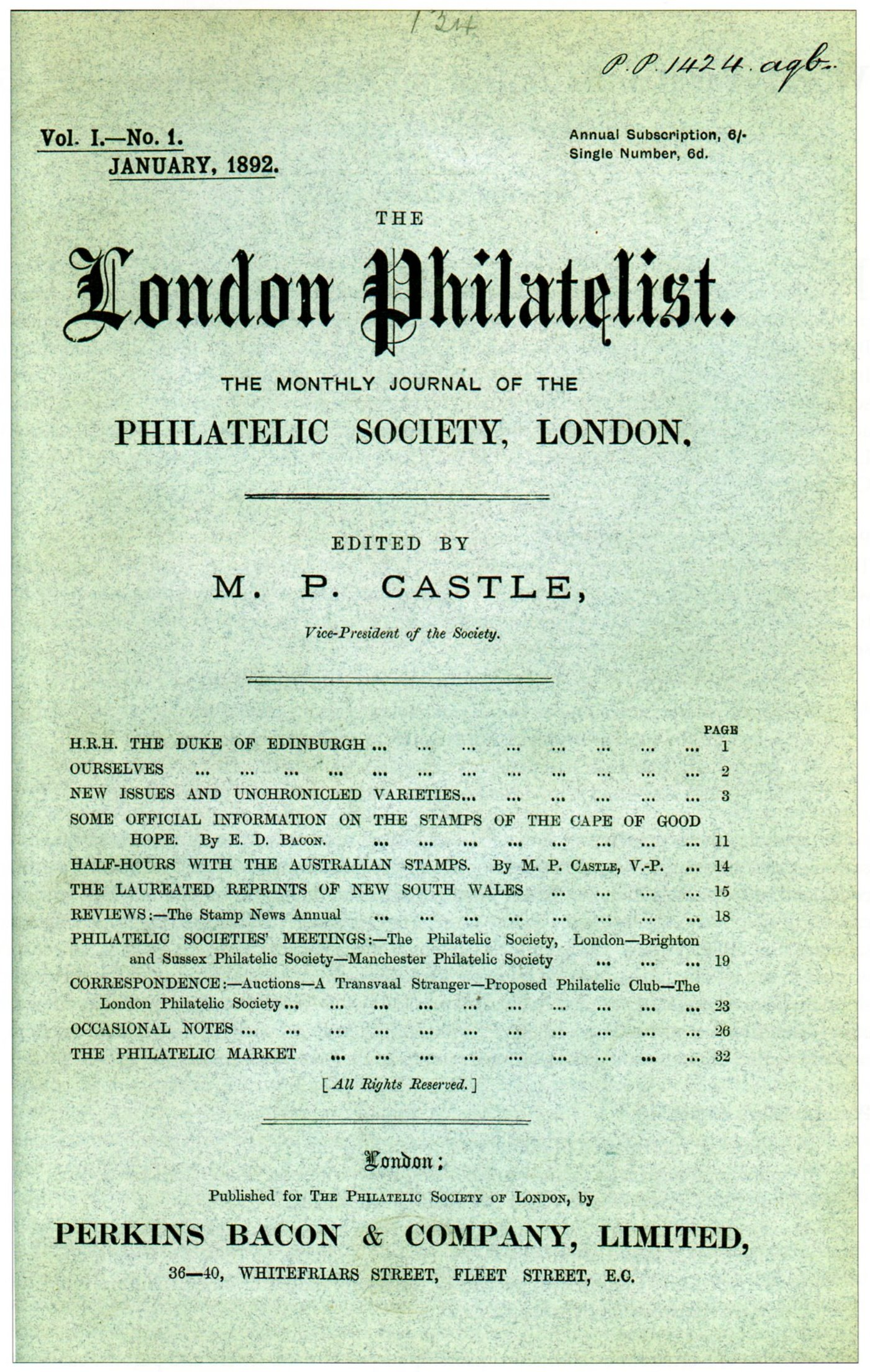
The front cover of the first number of The London Philatelist, Vol. 1, No. 1, January 1892.

"The Royal," as it is known, has 2,200 members in dozens of countries, with the highest numbers of members in the United Kingdom and the United States. Members are of two classes, fellows and members. Fellows are entitled to use the post-nominals "FRPSL" (Fellow of the Royal Philatelic Society London).

Fellows are elected from members based on service to the society and to philately. The society publishes a journal, The London Philatelist, which includes articles, book reviews, society news, advertisements, and other items.

== Objects ==
The principal objects of the society are:

1. To promote, encourage and contribute to the advancement of the science and practice of philately.
2. To inform members of the Society on all matters affecting any of its objects by meetings, discussions, displays, lectures, correspondence or otherwise; to assist and carry out philatelic research, and to print, publish and issue such papers, periodicals, books, circulars or other literary matters in support of these objects.
3. To hold, either alone or jointly with others, promote, or subscribe, or assist with international or other philatelic exhibitions in the UK or elsewhere, and to offer and award prizes, medals or other recognition in connection with such exhibitions or for any literary work connected with philately.
4. To establish and maintain a library and collections of stamps, designs, proofs, essays and other articles of interest relating to any of the objects of the Society.

== Awards and medals ==
The society awards the Crawford Medal for the most valuable and original contribution to the study and knowledge of philately published in book form during the two years preceding the award.

The society also awards these silver medals:

- The Tilleard Medal for the best large display of any aspect of philately given by one, or not more than two, fellows or members during the relevant period.
- The Lee Medal for the best paper dealing with any aspect of philately given by one fellow or member during the relevant period.
- The Tapling Medal for the best paper written by a fellow or member and published in The London Philatelist during the relevant period.

== Officers and Council ==
All officers and members of Council are listed on the society's website.

== See also ==
- List of presidents of the Royal Philatelic Society London
- Royal Philatelic Society London Meeting Handouts Collection
