= Barefoot (disambiguation) =

Barefoot also barefooted, the state of not wearing any footwear.

Barefoot may also refer to:

== In sports ==
- Barefoot running, running while barefoot—without wearing any shoes or socks on the feet
- Barefoot skiing, water skiing behind a motorboat without the use of water skis, commonly referred to as "barefooting"
- Barefoot (horse) (1820–1840), a British thoroughbred racehorse
- Barefoot horses, horses which are kept barefoot full-time, as opposed to horses who are fitted with horse shoes: see Natural hoof care

== In media and entertainment ==
- Barefoot (2005 film), a German romantic comedy film
- Barefoot (2014 film), an American romantic comedy-drama film
- Barefoot (2017 film), a Czech film
- Barefoot, a musical duo made up of TommyD and Sam Obernik
- Barefoot, an album by Ninet Tayeb
- Barefoot (miniseries), a 2011 Israeli television miniseries

== Other uses ==
- Barefoot (name)
- Barefoot Catalogue, series of stamp catalogues published in England by John Barefoot
- Barefoot, Kentucky, a community in the United States
- Barefoot (retailer), a chain of retail stores in Sri Lanka
- Of a truck/lorry in snowy and icy conditions, "without tyre chains"

== See also ==
- Barefoot and pregnant, a figure of speech
- Barefoot Augustinians, a religious order
- Barefoot Books, an independent children's book publisher based in Bath, UK and Cambridge, Massachusetts, USA
- Barefoot doctors, farmers who received minimal basic medical and paramedical training and worked in rural villages in the People's Republic of China
- Barefoot sandals, a form of footwear
- Barfoot, a surname
- Bearfoot (disambiguation)
