= Joe Ross =

Joe or Joseph Ross may refer to:

- Joe E. Ross (1914–1982), American actor born in New York City
- Joe Ross (baseball) (born 1993), American professional baseball player
- Joe Ross (philatelist) (contemporary), American philatelist
- Joe Ross (referee) (born 1959), English referee in the Football League
- Joseph Donovan Ross (1911–1984), politician from Alberta, Canada
- Joseph J. Ross (1841–1900), Vice President of Liberia
- Joseph Thorburn Ross (1849–1903), English artist
- "Joseph Ross", pseudonym used by science fiction editor Joseph Wrzos (1929–2023)
