= Joe Ross (philatelist) =

American philatelist

Joseph L. Ross is an American philatelist who has specialized in the revenue stamps of South America. Ross has also been a prolific philatelic author, compiling or updating a large number of revenue stamp catalog and writing numerous articles in philatelic journals. His catalog of Uruguay revenues, for instance, is the first since Forbin's world catalog of 1915 and starts where that one finished.

In 2008 Ross won the Revenue Society Research Medal.

== Selected publications ==
- The revenue stamps of El Salvador. Elverta, California: Joe Ross, 1994. (Editor)
- Panama telegraph stamps. 2000. (With Federico Brid)
- The revenue stamps of Iraq. Joe Ross, third edition 2002. (With Avo Kaplanian and John Powell)
- The revenue stamps of Qatar. 2003.
- The revenue stamps of Jordan & the Occupied Territory (West Bank). 2004. (With Avo Kaplanian)
- The revenue stamps of Uruguay Patente de Rodados de Departamento de Montevideo Vehicle Registration Department of Montevideo 1928–1963. Elverta, California: Joe Ross, 2005. ISBN 0967730724
- Panama revenues, Papel Sellado 1821–1975. 2008.
- Revenue stamps: The Republic of Uruguay 1915–2005. Elverta, California: Joe Ross, 2012. ISBN 0967730716
- The revenue stamps of Liberia. Lydbrook, Glos: The Revenue Society, 2012. (With Clive Akerman and Bryant E. Korn)
