= Bojanowicz Collection =

Collection of Polish stamps

The Bojanowicz Collection is an important collection of Polish stamps and postal history of 1938-1946 that forms part of the British Library Philatelic Collections where it complements the Kaluski Collection. The collection was formed by Mirosław Bojanowicz and donated in 1966.

The collection includes:

- Łódź Ghetto post.
- Underground posts.
- Warsaw Scout post.
- Polish Government in Exile material.
- Prisoner of War mail.
- Polish Free Forces material.

== See also ==
- Kaluski Collection
- Postage stamps and postal history of Poland
