= Barefoot (name) =

Barefoot is both a surname and a given name. Notable people with the name include:

Surname:

- Chad Barefoot (born 1983), American politician from North Carolina
- Napoleon Barefoot (born 1930), Superior Court Judge North Carolina
- Herbert Barefoot (1887–1958), English military officer and architect
- John Barefoot (born 1948), British stamp dealer, publisher of the Barefoot Catalogue
- Karen Barefoot, American basketball coach
- Ken Barefoot (born 1945), American football tight end
- Magnus Barefoot (1073–1103), King of Norway
- Robert Barefoot (born 1944), Canadian alternative health doctor
- William Barefoot (1872–1941), British politician

Given name:

- Barefoot Sanders (1925–2008), American District Judge from Texas
