= Gary Ryan =

Gary Ryan may refer to:

- Gary Ryan (athlete) (born 1972), former Irish sprinter
- Gary Ryan (philatelist) (1916–2008), British philatelist
