= Janusz Kaluski =

Janusz Kaluski FRPSL
- Portrait of Kaluski, c. 1940s-50s
- Born: Janusz Marja Stefan Rogala Kaluski; 1924; Second Polish Republic
- Died: 2010 (aged 85–86); United Kingdom

Janusz Marja Stefan Rogala Kaluski (1924–2010) was a sapper in the Polish Army who took part in the D-Day landings of World War II and who later won the Cross of Valour. In later life, Kaluski devoted himself to the philately of Poland, eventually becoming a Fellow of the Royal Philatelic Society London and donating his stamp collection of fifty years to the British Library Philatelic Collections in 2003.

== Early life ==
Jan Kaluski was born in Poland in 1924 and began collecting stamps in 1933, continuing until the outbreak of World War II in 1939.

== World War II ==
Kaluski joined the Polish Army in the West in 1941, after arriving in Scotland via Persia, Palestine, Egypt and South Africa. He took part in the D-Day landings as a sapper and carried out mine-clearing work in the Netherlands. He was awarded the Cross of Valour. After the war he settled in the United Kingdom where he lived for the rest of his life.

== Later life ==
Kaluski restarted his stamp collection in the early 1950s and spent the following fifty years expanding it.

He was reported as saying that he wished to donate his collection to the British people as a way of thanking them for welcoming him to Britain.

== The Kaluski Collection ==
The Kaluski Collection was donated to the British Library Philatelic Collections in 2003 and includes in 46 volumes postage stamps and postal history material of Poland from 1835 to 2002.

== See also ==
- Polonus Philatelic Society
- Postage stamps and postal history of Poland
