= Grand Prix Club =

The Grand Prix Club logo.

The Grand Prix Club is a club for philatelists who have won a Grand Prix award of any kind from a Fédération Internationale de Philatélie accredited philatelic exhibition.

== Presidents of the club ==
- 1979 to 1982 Miroslaw A. Bojanowicz RDP
- 1982 to 1986 Gary S. Ryan RDP
- 1986 to 1989 John H. Levett RDP
- 1989 to 1992 Saverio Imperato
- 1992 to 1994 Christian C. Sundman RDP
- 1994 to 1996 Rolf-Dieter Jaretzky RDP
- 1996 to 2000 Robert P. Odenweller RDP
- 2000 to 2011 David J. Springbett RDP
- 2011 to current Tay Peng Hian RDP
