= Gary Ryan (philatelist) =

British philatelist (1916–2007)

Gary Sidney Ryan (1916–2007) was an eminent philatelist who specialised in the stamps and postal history of Hungary and later in revenue stamps.

Ryan was awarded the Crawford Medal of the Royal Philatelic Society London in 1988 for his work on the cancellations of Hungarian Post Offices on the first stamps of Hungary and he signed the Roll of Distinguished Philatelists in 1980. His philatelic writing won him a rarely awarded Grand Prix award for Literature at Frankfurt in 1989.

With Robson Lowe and Ronald Butler, Ryan was one of the founders of The Revenue Society of Great Britain in 1990 and his involvement with the FIP (Federation Internationale de Philatelie) was instrumental in raising the profile of Revenue stamps within the organisation. Ryan's extensive collection of judicial revenue stamps was the basis for "Judicial Stamps of Great Britain and Pre-1922 Ireland" by Roger Booth and Clive Akerman published in 1997.

Ryan's profession as a lawyer helped him obtain revenue stamps used on documents with which to expand his collection.

From 1982 to 1986 he was the President of the Grand Prix Club.

After his death, Ryan's collection was auctioned by Christies.

== Selected publications ==
- "The Hungarian classics" in The London Philatelist, Vol. 82 June & November 1973.
- "The first stamps of Hungary" in Stamp Collecting, 29 November 1979.
- The cancellations of Hungarian post offices on the first five issues of Austrian stamps, 1850-67, during the Austrian administration, Royal Philatelic Society London, 1980. ISBN 0-900631-09-0.
- "1867 – the first issue of Hungary" in The London Philatelist, Vol. 93, March/April 1984.
- The Cancellations of Hungarian Post Offices on the First Issue of Hungary 1867-1871, Royal Philatelic Society London, 1988. ISBN 0-900631-18-X.
- Rarest Mixed Frankings of Hungary: Handbook and Catalogue, Royal Philatelic Society London, 1992. ISBN 0-900631-26-0.

== See also ==
- Postage stamps and postal history of Hungary
- Ryan Collection A collection of Budapest municipal revenue stamps, donated by Ryan to the British Library Philatelic Collections in 2001.
