= Fischer catalog =

Annual postage stamps publication

The Fischer Catalogue of Polish stamps (Katalog Polskich Znaków Pocztowych ISBN 83-904344-6-6) is a yearly publication in catalogue form of postage stamps relating to Poland.

The purpose of the catalogue is to describe postage stamps related to Poland and to estimate their value in the philatelic market.

== Publisher ==
The catalogue is published in Poland by Firma Handlowo-Usługowa Andrzej Fischer, 41-902 Bytom, Rynek 11. Editor/publishers are Andrzej Fischer, Stanisław Styła, and Jerzy Walocha.

== Format ==
The catalogue is issued yearly in two volumes: Tom I and Tom II. All postage stamps are illustrated in full colour. Value of individual stamps is listed in Polish currency. An introduction has sections written in Polish, German, and also in English.

== Content ==
The catalogue covers the full extent of Polish philately and is comprehensive in the following categories.

- Postage stamps of Poland
- City locals
- Austrian occupation
- German occupation
- Military mail
- Exile stamps
- Propaganda stamps
- Post-wartime overprints
- Prisoner-of-war
- Displaced persons
- Postal stationery
- Plebiscite issues
- Port Gdansk
- Cinderellas
- Charity stamps

== Expertise ==
The catalogue lists a number of experts who can verify authenticity of rare Polish stamps. These experts are listed under “Lista ekspertów Polskiego Związku Filatelistów i ekspertów międzynarodowych.”

== Availability ==
The catalogue is available in Poland, as well as in the United States and Canada. Requests for information related to the purchase of the catalogs should be directed to the Polonus philatelic society, located in Chicago, Illinois.

== See also ==
- List of stamp catalogues
- Polonus Philatelic Society
- Postage stamps and postal history of Poland
