= Mirosław Bojanowicz =

Polish philatelist

Mirosław Artur Bojanowicz
- Born: Miroslav Bojanović; 1906; Condominium of Bosnia and Herzegovina
- Died: 9 May 1986 (aged 79–80)
- Occupation: Philatelist

Mirosław Artur Bojanowicz (1906 – 9 May 1986) was a Polish philatelist who settled in England after World War II and became a recognized expert on the stamps of Poland. He frequently served as a judge at international exhibitions and in 1966 was invited to sign the Roll of Distinguished Philatelists; Bojanowicz was one of very few professional philatelists to be accorded this honour.

== Early life ==
Bojanowicz was born in the Balkans and as a child moved with his parents to Poland. He was of Bosnian origin, his original name was Miroslav Bojanović which was polonised to Mirosław Bojanowicz.

Before the war he collected Bosnia and Herzegovina for which he won a gold medal in Warsaw in 1936. He later expanded this collection to the whole of Yugoslavia.

== After World War II ==
After the war he formed a collection of the postal history and stamps of Poland for the period 1938 to 1946 which, in 1966, he donated to the British Museum (now the British Library). This collection includes Łodz ghetto post, underground posts, Warsaw Scout post, Polish government in exile, prisoner of war mail and Polish Free Forces mail.

== Poland number one ==
He specialised in Poland No 1 and probably had one of the largest collection of this stamp in the world. This collection comprised some 1,500 copies of the stamp, over 300 covers and about 600 documents from this period. He started this collection in 1952. He was the author of The Kingdom of Poland: Poland No 1 and associated Postal History (1979).

== Donation ==
In 1966 Bojanowicz donated an important collection of Polish stamps and postal history of 1938-1946 to the British Library Philatelic Collections where it forms the Bojanowicz Collection and complements the Kaluski Collection.

== Awards ==
Bojanowiz won many awards for his collection including:

- 1960 Grand Prix at the Warsaw Centenary Exhibition
- 1961 Grand Prix of the President of Italy at the Merano International Exhibition
- 1962 Grand Prix D’Honneur at the Budapest International

From 1979 to 1982 he was the first President of the Grand Prix Club.

Bojanowicz was survived by his wife Lina (née Balestri), with whom he had two daughters.

== See also ==
- Postage stamps and postal history of Poland
