= Circumnavigation world record progression =

This is a list of the fastest circumnavigation, made by a person or team, excluding orbits of Earth from spacecraft.

== List ==
People or team	Total duration	Departure date	Arrival date	Notes	Reference
Juan Sebastián Elcano and crew (originally led by Ferdinand Magellan)	2 years, 11 months and 17 days	20 September 1519	6 September 1522	Magellan expedition	
Francis Drake and crew	2 years, 9 months and 13 days	13 December 1577	26 September 1580	Francis Drake's circumnavigation	
Thomas Cavendish and crew	2 years, 1 month and 19 days	21 July 1586	9 September 1588	Thomas Cavendish's circumnavigation	
Crew of the Eendracht (originally led by Willem Schouten and Jacob Le Maire)	2 years and 17 days	14 June 1615	1 July 1617		
John Byron and crew	1 year, 10 months and 7 days	2 July 1764	9 May 1766		
George Simpson	1 year, 7 months and 26 days	4 March 1841	31 October 1842		
Clipper Marco Polo, Captain James "Bully" Forbes.	175 days	4 July 1852	26 December 1852	From Liverpool	
Clipper Lightning, Captain James "Bully" Forbes.	162 days	14 May 1854	23 October 1854	From Liverpool to Liverpool.	
This period is incomplete	-	1854	1870	-	
George Francis Train	80 days	10 July 1870	21 December 1870	By ships and trains, from New York City. Counting only time spent traveling; Train stopped along the way to give lectures and support the Communards, and was held in a French jail for 13 days as a result. This circumnavigation has been attributed with inspiring Jules Verne.	
Nellie Bly	72 days	14 November 1889	25 January 1890	Multiple means of transport, inspired by Jules Verne	
George Francis Train	67 days, 12 hours and 3 minutes	18 March 1890	24 May 1890	By ships and trains, from Tacoma, Washington	
George Francis Train	64 days	9 May 1891	12 July 1891	By ships and trains, from Fairhaven, Washington	
J. Willis Sayre	54 days, 9 hours and 42 minutes	26 June 1903	20 August 1903	From Seattle, via Trans-Siberian Railway.	
Andre Jaeger-Schmidt, Henry Frederick, John Henry Mears	35 days, 21 hours, 35 minutes and 18 seconds	2 July 1913	6 August 1913	A combination of steamers, yachts, and trains	
Linton Wells, Edward S. Evans	28 days, 14 hours, 36 minutes and 5 seconds	16 June 1926	14 July 1926	A combination of boat, airplane, and trains	
John Henry Mears	23 days, 15 hours, 36 minutes and 5 seconds	28 June 1928	22 July 1928		
Hugo Eckener	21 days, 5 hours and 31 minutes	8 August 1929	29 August 1929	First circumnavigation in an airship, aboard LZ 127 Graf Zeppelin from Lakehurst, New Jersey	
Pilot Wiley Post and navigator Harold Gatty	8 days, 15 hours and 31 minutes	23 June 1931	1 July 1931	Lockheed Vega aeroplane, travelled 24,903 kilometres (15,474 miles), did not cross equator	
Wiley Post	7 days, 19 hours and 49 minutes	15 July 1933	22 July 1933	Using an autopilot and radio direction finder, did not cross equator. From New York City	
Howard Hughes, navigator Thomas Thurlow, engineer Richard Stoddard, and mechanic Ed Lund	3 days, 19 hours and 15 minutes	10 July 1938	14 July 1938	Lockheed 14 Super Electra (NX18973) New York City; flight operations manager Albert Lodwick	
Navigator Milton Reynolds, pilot Bill Odom and engineer Thomas Carroll "Tex" Sallee	3 days, 6 hours, 55 minutes and 30 seconds	12 April 1947	16 April 1947	Modified twin-engine Douglas A-26 Invader Reynolds Bombshell from/to LaGuardia Airport. Unofficial record, as the flight did not include points specified by the Fédération Aéronautique Internationale.	
James Gallagher and crew (United States Air Force)	3 days, 22 hours and 1 minute	2 March 1949	4 March 1949	B-50 Superfortress Lucky Lady II first aircraft to circle globe non-stop with four in-air refuelings, 37,743 kilometres (23,452 miles), did not cross equator and traveled no further south than the 20-degree parallel.	
Col. James Morris and crew (United States Air Force)	45 hours and 19 minutes	16 January 1957	18 January 1957	Operation Power Flite, three B-52 bombers, led by Lucky Lady III, supported by at least 76 KC-76 refueling aircraft, 39,147 kilometres (24,325 miles), no equatorial crossing	
David Springbett	44 hours and 6 minutes	8 January 1980	10 January 1980	Retains record for circumnavigation using only scheduled public transportation.	
Friendship One	36 hours, 54 minutes and 15 seconds	28 January 1988	30 January 1988	Boeing 747SP captained by Clay Lacy from Boeing Field in Seattle. Passengers included Neil Armstrong.	
Allen Paulson and three co-pilots	36 hours, 8 minutes and 34 seconds	26 February 1988	27 February 1988	Gulfstream IV flown by Gulfstream CEO Allen Paulson from William P. Hobby Airport in Houston, Texas.	
Air France Flight 1492	32 hours, 49 minutes and 3 seconds	12 October 1992	13 October 1992	Concorde FAI "Westbound Around the World" world air speed record from Lisbon, Portugal. Part of commemorations of the Columbus Quincentenary.	
Michel Dupont and Claude Hetru (Air France)	31 hours, 27 minutes and 49 seconds	15 August 1995	16 August 1995	Concorde with 98 passengers and crew, no equatorial crossing. "Eastbound Around the World" world air speed record from John F. Kennedy International Airport, New York.	

== Other categories ==
People or team	Total duration (days)	Departure date	Arrival date	Notes	Reference
United States Army Air Service, Lowell H. Smith and Leslie P. Arnold, and Erik H. Nelson and John Harding Jr.	175 calendar days, and covered 26,345 miles (42,398 km)	17 March 1924	28 September 1924	First aerial circumnavigation 363 flying hours 7 minutes; two aircraft of four Douglas World Cruisers complete the mission from Sand Point, Seattle, Washington.	
Charles Kingsford Smith, Charles Ulm, and crew	over 2 years	31 May 1928	June 1930	Southern Cross from Oakland, California	
Captain Ford and Crew	one month	2 December 1941	6 January 1942	Pan American World Airways' Pacific Clipper the Boeing 314 Clipper flying boat NC-18609(A) the first commercial plane flight to circumnavigate the world from Treasure Island, San Francisco to LaGuardia Field.	
Rutan Voyager, Dick Rutan and Jeana Yeager	9 days, 3 minutes and 44 seconds	14 December 1986	23 December 1986	first aircraft to fly around the world without stopping or refueling from Edwards Air Force Base	
Bertrand Piccard and Brian Jones	19 days, 21 hours, and 55 minutes	1 March 1999	21 March 1999	Breitling Orbiter 3 first balloon to fly around the world non-stop from Swiss Alpine village of Château-d'Oex	
Steve Fossett	13 days, 8 hours, 33 minutes	19 June 2002	3 July 2002	Spirit of Freedom balloon, first solo aircraft to fly around the world without stopping or refueling from Northam, Western Australia	
Steve Fossett	67 hours, 1 minute, 10 seconds	28 February 2005	3 March 2005	GlobalFlyer first solo nonstop un-refueled fixed-wing aircraft flight around the world from Salina, Kansas	
Bertrand Piccard and André Borschberg	5 months	9 March 2015	Five months later	Solar Impulse the first round-the-world solar flight in history.	

== See also ==
- List of circumnavigations
