= Bearfoot =

Bearfoot may refer to:

- Bearfoot (Canadian band), a Canadian band
- Bearfoot (American band), a post-bluegrass band
- Bear Foot, a monster truck

== See also ==
- Barefoot (disambiguation)
