= David Springbett =

British philatelist and insurance broker (1938–2022)

David John Springbett, FRPSL
- Born: 1938
- Died: 22 December 2022 (aged 83–84); Chichester
- Occupations: Philatelist; insurance broker

David John Springbett, FRPSL (1938–2022) was a British philatelist and former insurance broker, who signed the Roll of Distinguished Philatelists in 2004.

== Philatelic activity ==
Springbett was President of the Grand Prix Club, a fellow of the Royal Philatelic Society London, President of The Revenue Society and a former Chairman of the Stanley Gibbons company.

He was Chairman of The Stamp Show 2000 in Earls Court, London and was involved in planning for an alternative stamp exhibition to the London 2010 International Stamp Exhibition. The alternative show would have been based at the ExCel conference centre in east London, but the project was abandoned when the Fédération Internationale de Philatélie (FIP) gave the London 2010 show approved status.

In 2001, Springbett edited and compiled a biographical guide to the more than seventy philatelists who have been awarded a Grand Prix award at a philatelic exhibition held between 1950 and 2000.

His philatelic interests lay in revenue stamps and the large key plate stamps of Nyasaland. He won a Grand Prix medal for his exhibit of Straits Settlements at Bangkok in 1993 and was a candidate for a Grand Prix with his Nyasaland revenue stamps in Australia in 1999 and Nyasaland key types at Istanbul 1999.

== Outside philately ==
David Springbett was an insurance broker and a campaigner on behalf of Lloyds names.

Along with Malcolm Pearson and John Webb he founded Pearson Webb Springbett in 1964 which eventually became PWS Holdings.

He lived in Taplow, Buckinghamshire.

== World record flight ==
On January 8–10, 1980, Springbett set a world record for the fastest non-orbital circumnavigation of the earth ever completed up to that time, using only scheduled airline passenger flights to do so. He left Los Angeles International Airport on January 8 at 7:42 p.m. on a British Airways flight to London, then took a supersonic Concorde flight from London to Singapore, changing planes in Bangkok, Manila, Tokyo, Honolulu, and finally landing back in Los Angeles on January 10 at 3:48 p.m. Springbett's journey, which was completed in 44 hours and six minutes, broke the previous world record that had been set by Operation Power Flite in 1957, in which three Boeing B-52 Stratofortress bombers relying on in-flight refueling circumnavigated the globe in 45 hours and 19 minutes. The record set by Springbett remained in place until the Friendship One charity flight took place in 1988.

== Publications ==
- The Grand Prix Club Book 1950–2000, David Feldman, Geneva, Switzerland, 2001. ISBN 2-9700125-2-9
