= Kaluski Collection =

The Kaluski Collection is a collection of stamps of Poland that forms part of the British Library Philatelic Collections. It was formed by Janusz Kaluski and donated to the library in 2003 and includes 46 volumes detailing the stamps and postal history material of Poland from 1835 to 2002.

Notable items include:

- The first stamps of the newly independent Polish state after the end of World War I.
- Stamps issued in the nineteenth century when Poland was under Russian control.
- Stamps of the German occupation of Poland during World War II.
- Stamps of the Polish government-in-exile during World War II.

The collection is the most important holding of Polish philatelic material at the Library and complements the existing holdings in the Bojanowicz Collection of Polish postal history 1938–46, and parts of the Fitzgerald Collection of airmails to 1946, the Tapling Collection and the Universal Postal Union Collection.

== See also ==
- Bojanowicz Collection
- Postage stamps and postal history of Poland
