= John Henry Mears =

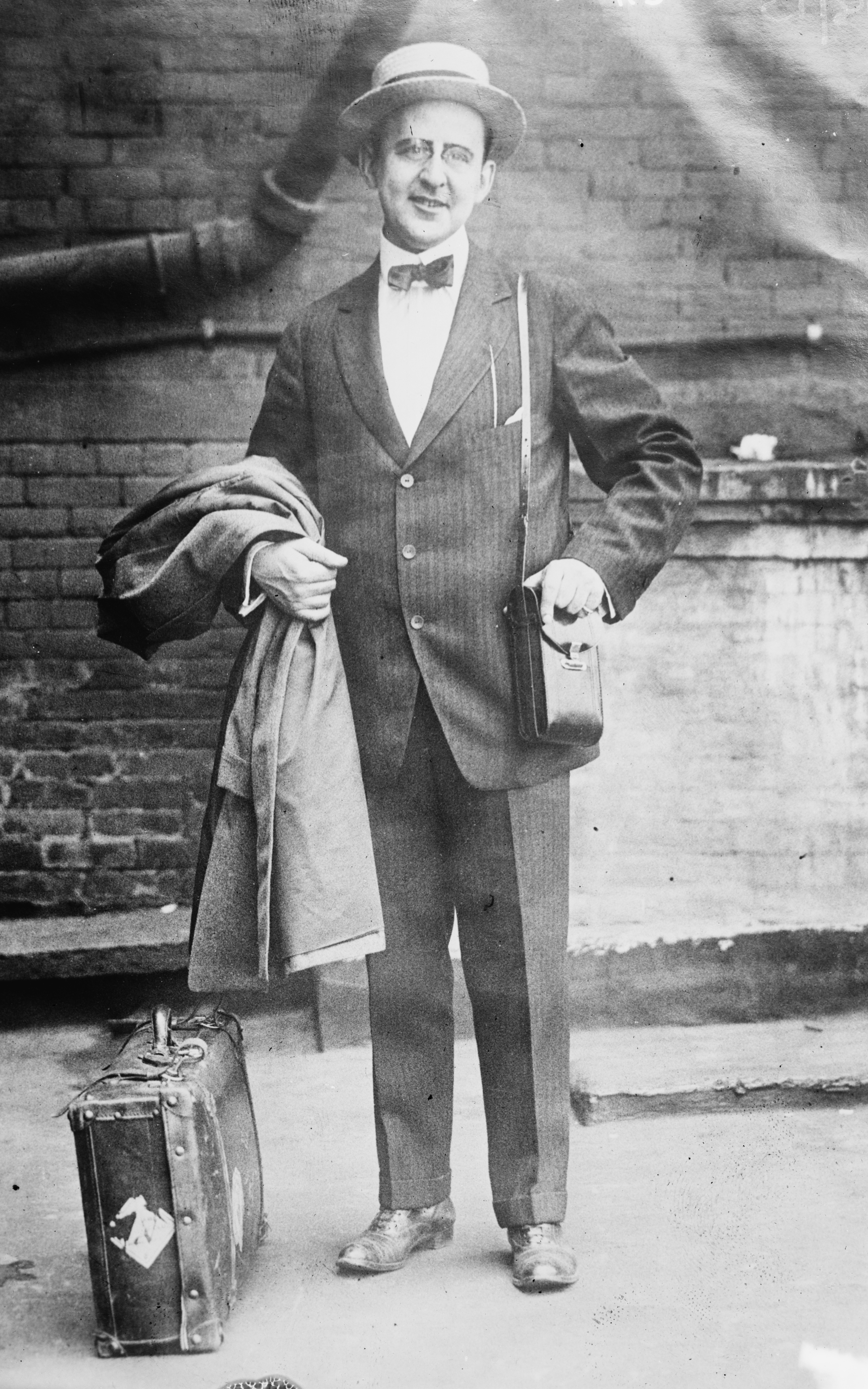
- Born: May 22, 1878; Massachusetts
- Died: July 26, 1956 (aged 78); Los Angeles, California
- Known for: Established a record, fastest trip around the world.

John Henry Mears (May 22, 1878 – July 26, 1956) was an American who made the record for the fastest trip around the world in both 1913 and 1928. He was also a Broadway producer.

== Biography ==
He was born on May 22, 1878, in Massachusetts.

On July 2, 1913, he left New York City on the RMS Mauretania, then traveled by a combination of steamers, yachts, and trains to circumnavigate the Earth and reach New York City again on August 6, 1913. He had an elapsed time of 35 days, 21 hours, 35 minutes, 18 and four-fifths seconds. His world record stood for 13 years. In 1928, he set the record again at 23 days 15 hours 21 minutes and 3 seconds. In the same year he wrote an autobiography called Racing the Moon.

After the Graf Zeppelin broke his record in 1929, he made one last attempt in 1930. He had to abandon the trip after the airplane he was on was damaged during takeoff.

He died at Hollywood Presbyterian Hospital in Los Angeles on July 26, 1956.

== 1913 Itinerary ==
- United States: New York City from the offices of the New York Sun newspaper on July 2, 1913
- Atlantic crossing: via the steamer "Mauretania"
- England: Fishguard, London & Dover via train
- France: Calais via channel steamer, Paris via train
- Germany: Berlin via train
- Russia: St Petersburg & Omsk via train
- China: Harbin, Manchuria & Mukden via train
- Korea: Pusan via train
- Japan: Shimonoseki via steamer & Tokyo via train
- Pacific crossing: via the steamer "Empress of Russia"
- Canada: Victoria, British Columbia where he left steamer en route and boarded a yacht. Left yacht en route and boarded a hydroplane
- United States: Seattle, Washington, St Paul, Minnesota, Chicago Illinois, Cleveland, Ohio & New York City back to the offices of the New York Sun newspaper via train
