= Ryan Collection =

The Ryan Collection is a collection of municipal revenue stamps of Budapest from 1898 to 1947 formed by Gary Ryan. It forms part of the British Library Philatelic Collections and was donated to the Library in 2001.

== See also ==
- Postage stamps and postal history of Hungary
