= Saverio Imperato =

Italian immunologist and philatelist (1935–2020)

- Born: 31 March 1935
- Died: 20 November 2020 (aged 85)
- Occupation: Immunologist

Saverio Imperato FRPSL (31 March 1935 - 20 November 2020) was an Italian immunologist and award-winning philatelist.

== Early life and family ==
Saverio Imperato was born on 31 March 1935. He married Luisa.

== Career ==
Imperato was an immunologist, microbiologist, and pathologist at the University of Genoa.

== Philately ==
He was awarded six Grands Prix, 60 Large Gold medals and 19 Gold medals in competitive philately. He was president of the Grand Prix Club from 1989 to 1992. He was a fellow of the Royal Philatelic Society London.

== Death ==
Imperato died on 20 November 2020.
