= Revenue stamps of Argentina =

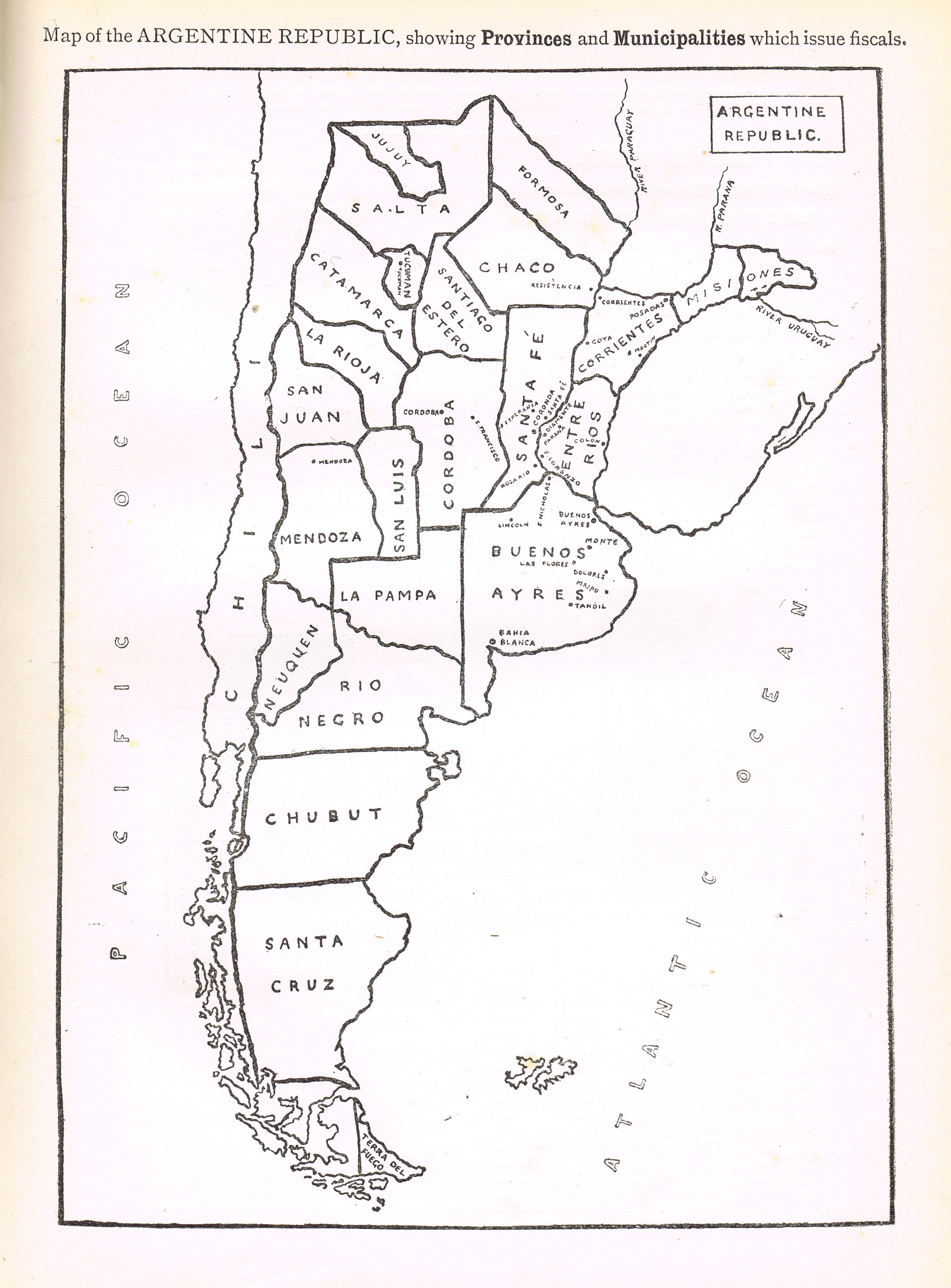
Map of the Argentine provinces and municipalities that had issued revenue stamps up to 1904. (Ex Walter Morley's catalogue.

Argentina has been one of the most prolific issuers of revenue stamps. Stamps have been issued by both the Argentine Republic and individual Argentine provinces and covered a wide range of duties from taxes on documents to hat taxes. The stamps form one of the most complex studies in revenue philately and have been exhaustively catalogued by Clive Ackerman in six volumes. However, new discoveries continue to be made.

== First revenue stamps ==
The first revenue stamps of the Republic were issued on 1 January 1878 for documentary taxes and taxes on foreign bills. Revenue stamps had been issued in the provinces from an earlier date and stamped paper had been in use since Spanish colonial times.

== Gallery ==
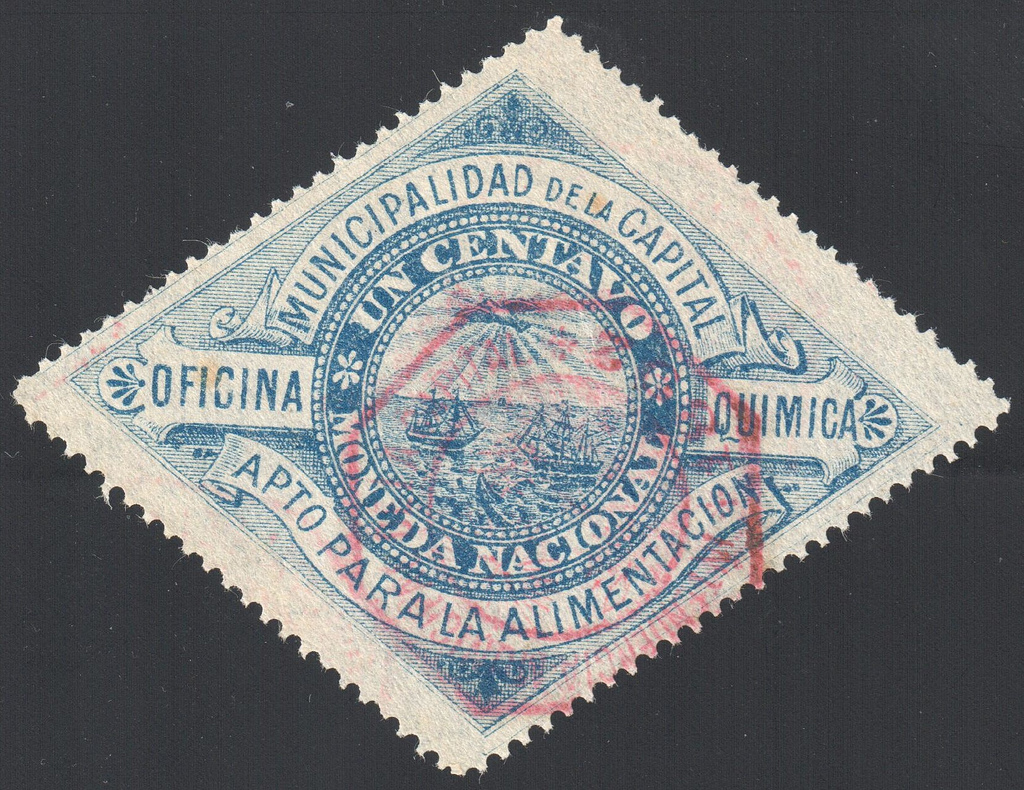
Revenue stamp of the Argentine province of Buenos Aires.

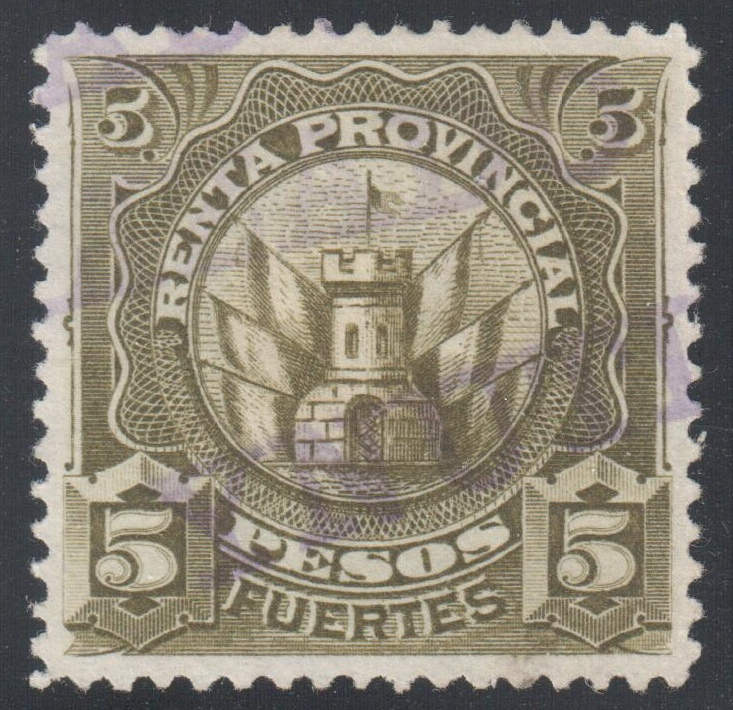
Revenue stamp of the Argentine province of Cordoba.

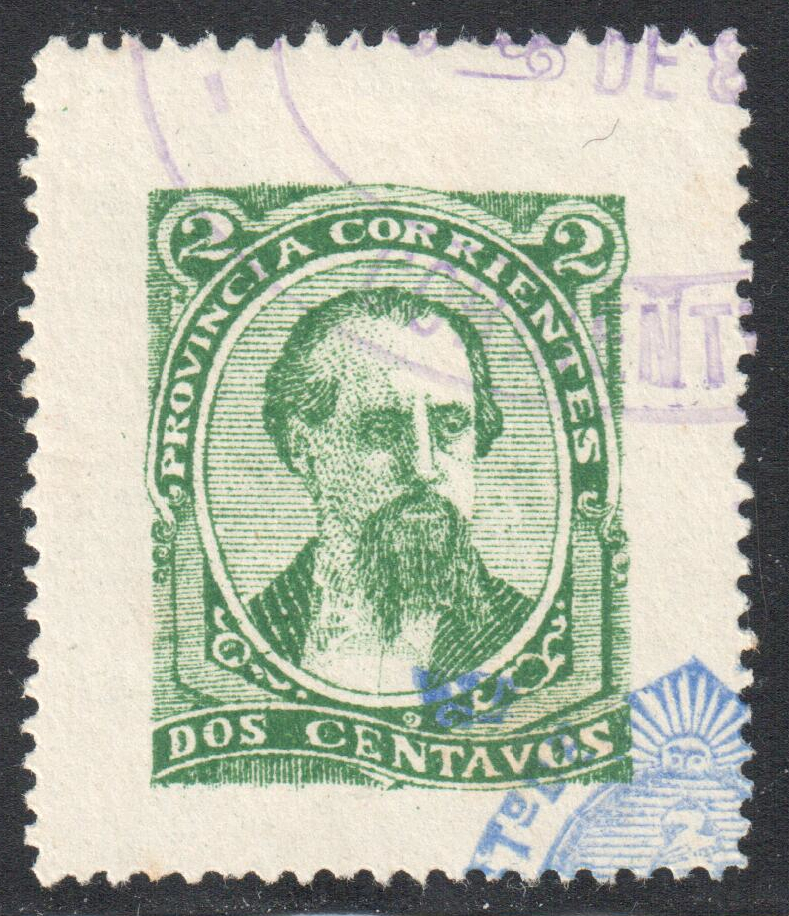
Revenue stamp of the Argentine province of Corrientes.

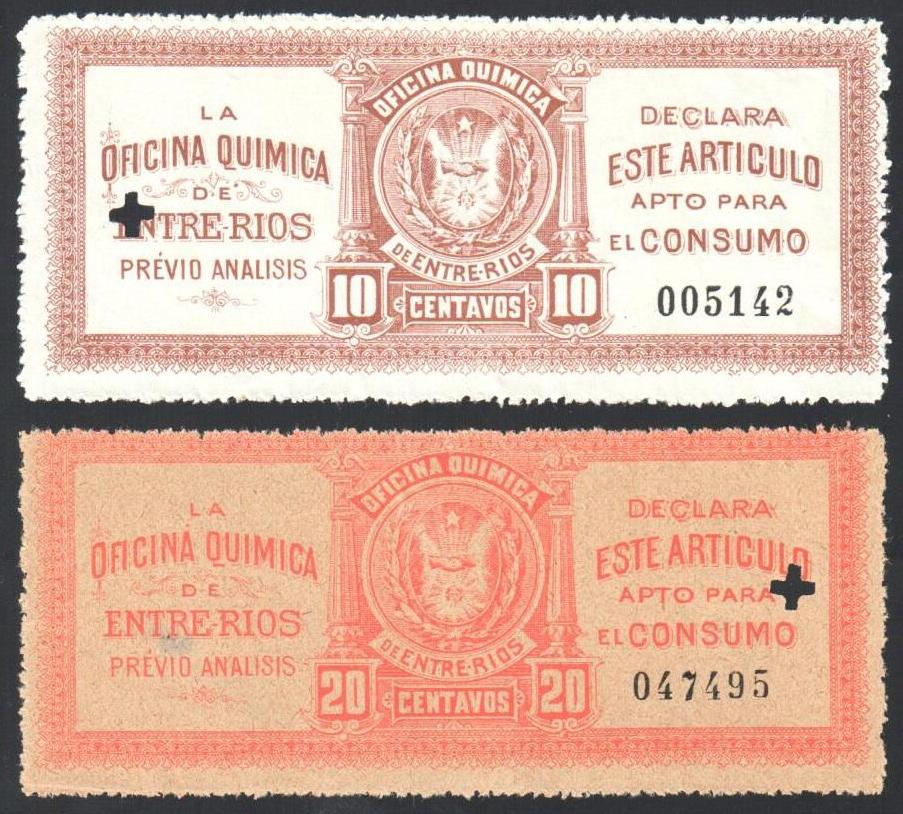
Revenue stamps of the Argentine province of Entre Rios.

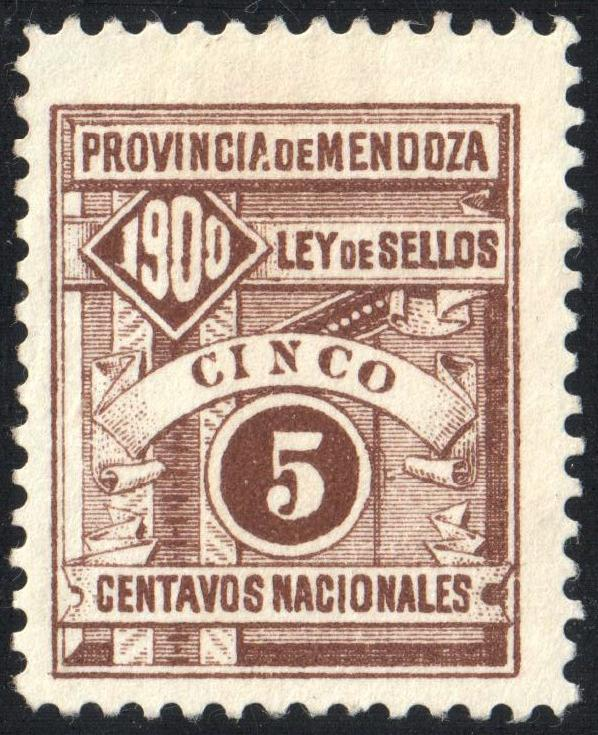
Revenue stamp of the Argentine province of Mendoza.

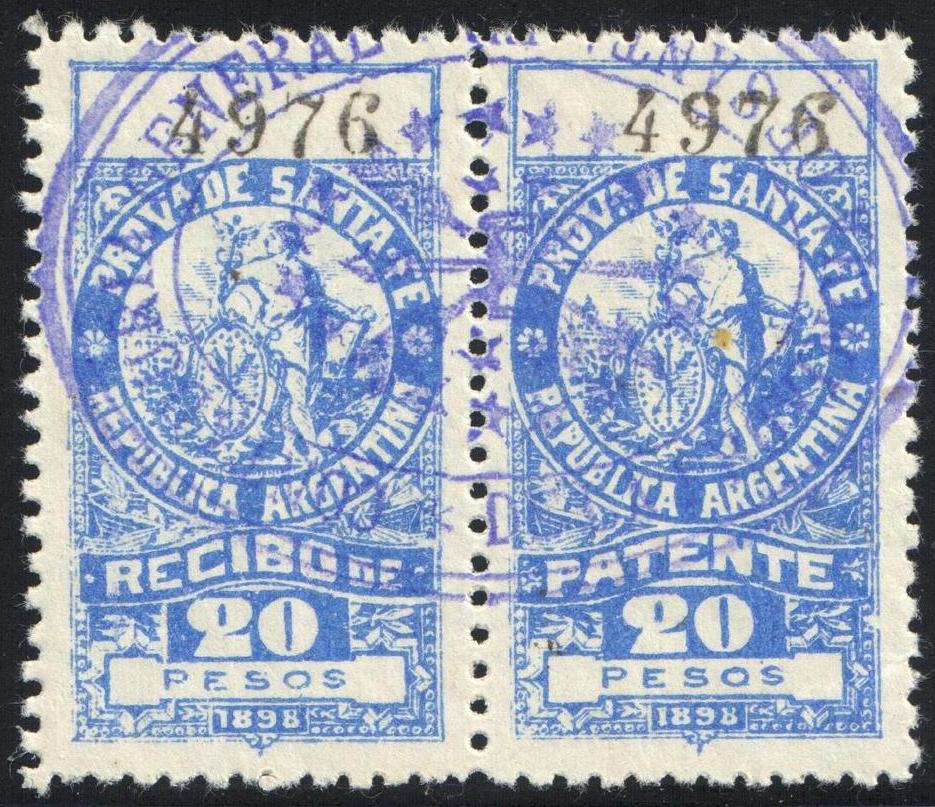
Revenue stamps of the Argentine province of Santa Fe.

== See also ==
- Postage stamps and postal history of Argentina
