= Leslie Barefoot =

Herbert John Leslie Barefoot
- Born: 15 May 1887; Dulwich, London
- Died: 23 December 1958 (aged 71); Ipswich, Suffolk
- Burial place: New Ipswich Cemetery, Ipswich
- Military career
- Allegiance: United Kingdom
- Branch: British Army
- Service years: 1915–1921; 1940–1945
- Rank: Major
- Unit: Royal Engineers
- Conflicts: First World War; Second World War: The Blitz
- Awards: George Cross; Mentioned in Despatches

Herbert John Leslie Barefoot, GC (15 May 1887 – 23 December 1958) was a British Army officer and a recipient of the George Cross, the highest award for gallantry for actions not involving direct enemy action granted to British military personnel.

== Early life and career ==
He was born Herbert John Leslie Barefoot the son of a timber merchant, Sidney John Barefoot and his wife Ellen Ann Mary née James.

He was educated as Dulwich College between 1900 and 1905. Before the First World War, he trained as an architect.

In the war, he served with the London Sanitary Company, Royal Army Medical Corps in the Egyptian Expeditionary Force (1916–1919). He was commissioned a lieutenant in the RAMC on 15 November 1915, and was promoted to captain on 15 May 1916. He was mentioned in despatches. He was demobilised on 30 September 1921, leaving the army as a captain. He continued to practice as an architect, becoming President of the Suffolk Association of Architects (1936–1938), and of the East Anglian Society of Architects in 1938.

== Second World War ==
In the Second World War, he joined the Royal Engineers, working in bomb disposal. He was commissioned a lieutenant on 15 March 1940, and was awarded the George Cross in 1940 "for most conspicuous gallantry in carrying out hazardous work in a very brave manner". The citation includes the following comments:

This officer dealt with and defused some of the first unexploded bombs in this country. In these early pioneer stages new types of bombs were constantly being found. Captain Barefoot was, therefore, responsible for the discovery of much new and valuable information. On July 28 he assisted Dr Merriman of London in experimenting on and afterwards defusing three unexploded bombs of a new shape at Great Yarmouth. By then Captain Barefoot had defused thirty or more such bombs of varying types and shapes. On the night of September 1 Captain Barefoot received information about unexploded bombs blocking the LNER main line. There were six live bombs in one place. This was a time when delayed-action time fuse bombs were much in use. In view of the importance of clearing the line at all costs, Captain Barefoot and his men deliberately ignored the safety period of four days then laid down. By 7am work was begun and continued without cessation in relays throughout the day. Captain Barefoot assisted personally in this remarkably expeditious operation, and by the evening the line had been cleared and at 6.40pm the first train was running. Normally this work would have taken a week to perform. Captain Barefoot worked on one of the first parachute magnetic mines dropped in this country. At the time we had very little knowledge of the mechanism of these mines, and much was learnt in these initial stages.

He was promoted major in 1941 and returned to his architectural practice after the war. He died aged 71 in 1958.

== Medals ==
Barefoot's medals are currently on display at the Imperial War Museum in London.
