= John Barefoot =

British philatelist (b. 1948)

- Born: April 1948 (age 78)
- Education: University of York
- Occupations: Philatelist, stamp dealer
- Known for: Catalogues of revenue stamps

John Barefoot (born April 1948) is a British philatelist, stamp dealer, and publisher, best known for his catalogues of revenue stamps which are known collectively as the "Barefoot catalogue".

Barefoot has collected stamps since he was a boy and first began to trade in them at the age of 14 to supplement his personal collection. He now trades as a stamp dealer in York, England, specialising in European stamps. Apart from his catalogues of revenue stamps he has also produced the European Philately series, a series of Forgery and Reprint Guides, and has edited the Journal of Chinese Philately.

In 1997, he was invited to sign the Maurice Williams Roll of Notable Cinderella Philatelists, and in 2010 he was awarded the Revenue Society's Research Medal for his work in the field of revenue philately.

== Early life ==
John Barefoot was born in April 1948. A stamp collector from a young age, he first began to trade in stamps at the age of 14 to supplement his personal collection of French issues. He received his advanced education at the University of York from where he graduated with the degree of Bachelor of Arts in linguistics, after which he self-published The Language Question in Belgium in 1970.

== Career ==
Barefoot trades as a stamp dealer in York, England, specialising in European stamps. Scott Tiffney, librarian at the American Philatelic Research Library, has described Barefoot as a "notable stamp dealer", and observed that his catalogues began to appear as revenue philately began to enjoy a renaissance in the 1970s.

Barefoot has produced three series of publications:

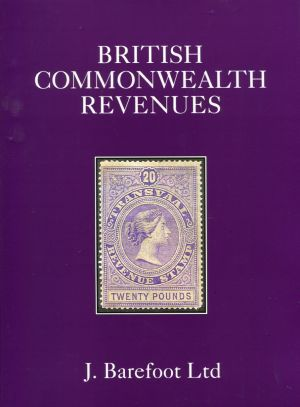
British Commonwealth Revenues, 10th edition, 2019.

- The European Philately series of booklets which The London Philatelist welcomed as dealing with material "beyond the scope of the standard catalogues" such as postmarks, proofs, errors, revenues, and local stamps.
- The Forgery and Reprint Guides. Booklets to assist in the "identification of forgeries, forged overprints, reprints, forged or doubtful postmarks and other problem stamps".
- The catalogues of revenue stamps collectively known to collectors as the "Barefoot catalogue", the largest volume of which is his British Commonwealth Revenues, first issued with Andrew Hall in 142 pages in 1980. The fifth edition was described by Clive Akerman in Gibbons Stamp Monthly as the "only comprehensive illustrated listing of the adhesive revenue stamps of the Commonwealth". In The London Philatelist, he described the sixth edition as "one of the revenue world's most important publications" and the equivalent for revenue stamps of Stanley Gibbons' British Commonwealth postage stamp catalogue. Akerman noted that the catalogue had continued to expand, from 219 to 271 pages in the sixth edition, as collectors continued to find new stamps and varieties of existing stamps for inclusion. In reviewing the 8th edition in 2008, Dingle Smith noted that the catalogue, which he described as "the A (Aden) to Z (Zululand) for British Commonwealth revenues" had many new entries, particularly of Australian stamps. By the tenth edition, published in 2019, the catalogue was over 500 pages long.

Barefoot was also the editor of the Journal of Chinese Philately.

In 2012 and 2013 a discussion took place in the pages of The Revenue Journal about the interface between postage stamp catalogues and revenue stamp catalogues in which the policies of the Stanley Gibbons (postage) and Barefoot (revenue) catalogues were compared and comment received from both, with John Barefoot observing that many of the most highly priced stamps in Gibbons' catalogues were used primarily or wholly for revenue (fiscal) purposes. In a guest editorial for The Revenue Journal in 2015, he extolled the benefits of revenue philately over collecting postage stamps, describing revenues as coming with a "fat-free guarantee, virtually free of exploitative commemoratives and made-for-collector issues."

== Awards ==
In 1997, Barefoot was invited to sign the Maurice Williams Roll of Notable Cinderella Philatelists. In 2010, he was awarded the Revenue Society's Research Medal for "...his many years of revenue research and ground-breaking publication of an enormous range of revenue catalogues which continue to act as the standard references for so many countries."

== Selected publications ==
All published by John Barefoot in York, England, unless otherwise shown.

=== European Philately series ===
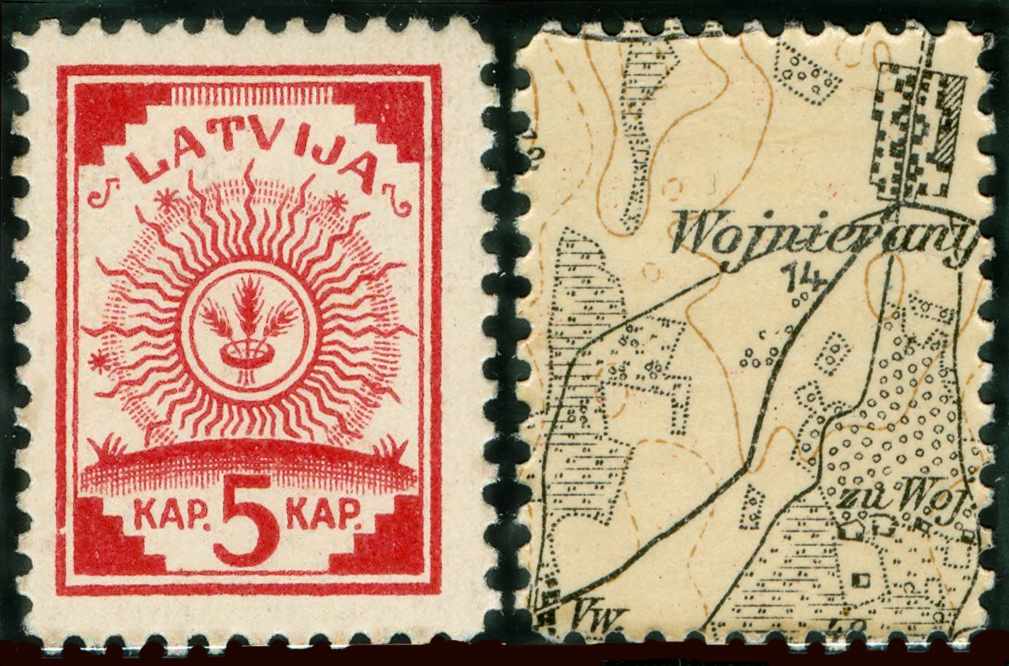
1918 stamp of Latvia, printed on the back of a map, the subject of No. 12 in the European Philately series.

- No. 1 Great Britain Revenues (1st, Chesterfield 1978) (2nd 1983)
- No. 2 Belgium Numeral Cancels 1849-1866 (Chesterfield, 1978)
- No. 3 Basle Police Revenues (Chesterfield, 1978)
- No. 4 Guernsey and Jersey Revenues (Chesterfield, 1979)
- No. 5 Hungary Revenues (1st, Chesterfield, 1979) (2nd 1987)
- No. 6 Poland Locals (1981) (With Andrew Hall)
- No. 7 GB Revenue Compendium (1981)
- No. 8 Denmark Numeral Cancels (1983) (With V. Tuffs)
- No. 9 Baltic States Revenues (1st 1983) (2nd 1988) (With Andrew Hall)
- No. 10 Romania Revenues by Andrew Hall (1983)
- No. 11 Georgia (1983) (With Andrew Hall)
- No. 12 Latvia Map Stamps (1983) (2nd 1987)
- No. 13 Norway Number One by V. Tuffs (1983)
- No. 14 Scandinavia Revenues by Andrew Hall (1st 1983) (2nd 1988)
- No. 15 Russian Zemstvos by F. G. Chuchin (1984)

=== Forgery and Reprint Guides ===
Titles in the series:

- No. 1 Great Britain (1983)
- No. 2 Alsace & Lorraine (1983)
- No. 3 Armenia 1922 Pictorials (1983) (With Andrew Hall)
- No. 4 Armenia 1923 Pictorials (1983) (With Andrew Hall)
- Nos. 5-6 Samoa Express (1983) (Editor) (With Andrew Hall)
- Nos. 7-8 D.D.S.G. (1983)
- No. 9 Latvia 1 (1983) (With Andrew Hall)
- No. 10 Latvia 2 Airmails (1983) (With Andrew Hall)
- No. 11 Azerbaijan (1983) (With Andrew Hall)
- No. 12 Portuguese Colonies (1983)
- No. 13 Roumania 1906 Charity Issue (1983)
- No. 14 Suez Canal (1983)
- No. 15 Poland Airmails (1983)
- No. 16 Western Army Eagles (1984) (With Andrew Hall)
- Nos. 17-18 Upper Silesia (1984) (With N. Urban)
- No. 19 Heligoland Reprints (1984)
- No. 20 Western Australia (1987)

=== Barefoot catalogue ===
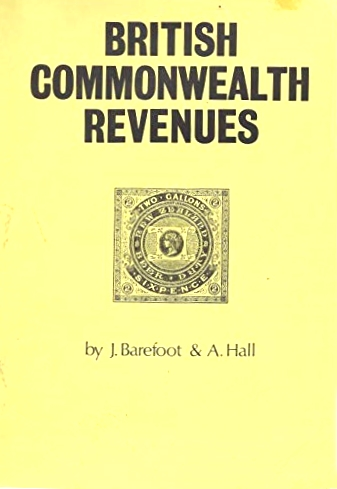
First edition of British Commonwealth Revenues, 1980.

- Hungary Revenues (1st 1979) (2nd 1987) (3rd 2007)
- British Commonwealth Revenues (1st 1980 & 2nd 1984 with Andrew Hall) (3rd 1986) (4th 1990) (5th 1996) (6th 2000) (7th 2002) (8th 2008) (9th 2012) (10th 2019)
- Benelux Revenues (1st 1987) (2nd 2007)
- Great Britain Revenues (3rd 1989) (4th 2002) (Continued from the European Philately series) Continued as United Kingdom Revenues from the 5th edition (2010)
- Baltic States Revenues (1998)
- Poland Revenues (1998)
- Czechoslovakia Revenues (2001)
- Albania & Greece Revenues (2002) (Special editor Roger Witts)
- Austria Revenues (2002) (Special editor Roger Witts)
- Bulgaria and Romania Revenues (2003) (With Valentin Robu)
- Yugoslavia Revenues (2003)
- Russia Revenues (2004)
- South East Asia Revenues (2006)
- Italy Revenues (2013)

=== Other ===
- The Language Question in Belgium (1970)
- Bhopal: Notes on plating the "primitives" (Chesterfield, 1978)
- Poland 1918 Locals (1999)
- Telegraph Stamps of the World (2013)

== See also ==
- Alfred Forbin
