= Joseph Thorburn Ross =

English painter

Joseph Thorburn Ross ARSA (15 May 1849 – 28 September 1903) was an English artist.

== Biography ==
He was born at Berwick-on-Tweed, the youngest child of two sons and two daughters of Robert Thorburn Ross, R.S.A. (1816–1876), by his wife Margaret Scott. The parents removed to Edinburgh for good when Joseph was a baby. Having been educated at the Military Academy, Hill Street, Edinburgh, he was engaged for a time in mercantile pursuits in Leith and Gloucester, but eventually, after a successful career as a student in the Edinburgh School of Art and the life school of the Royal Scottish Academy (1877–80), he devoted himself to painting as a profession. He first exhibited in 1872, but an unconventional strain in his work retarded its official recognition, and it was not till 1896 that he was elected an associate of the Royal Scottish Academy.

Portraiture, incident (but not anecdote), fantasy, landscape, and the sea were all treated by him, and if at times decorative intention and realism were imperfectly harmonised, and the execution and draughtsmanship, though bold, lacked mastery, the colour was nearly always striking and the result novel and interesting. But it was in sketches made spontaneously for themselves or as studies for more ambitious pictures that he was at his best. He worked in both oil and water-colour and possessed instinctive feeling for the proper use of each medium. Ross was familiar with the best art on the Continent, travelling much in Italy, and he was a frequent exhibitor at some of the leading exhibitions abroad, his 'Serata Veneziana' winning a diploma of honour at Dresden in 1892. He was unmarried and resided at Edinburgh with his sisters. He died from the effects of a fall in his Edinburgh studio on 28 September 1903.

Shortly after his death, at a memorial exhibition of his work held in Edinburgh, his admirers purchased 'The Bass Rock,' one of his most important pictures, and presented it to the National Gallery of Scotland. One of his two sisters, Christina Paterson Ross, R.S.W. (1843–1906), was well known as a watercolourist. His other sister. Miss Jessie Ross, Edinburgh, had three portraits of her brother, two when a child by his father, and one painted by William Small in 1903.
