= Polonus Philatelic Society =

- Founded: 1939
- Founder: Chester Mikucki
- Type: 501(c)(3)not-for-profit organization
- Purpose: postage stamps and postal history of Poland
- Location: Rossford, OH, USA
- Origins: Chicago, IL, USA
- Region served: Worldwide
- Method: meetings, study groups, journal, exhibits, expertization
- Revenue: membership fees, contributions, and sales of memorabilia
- Website: Polonus Philatelic Society

The Polonus Philatelic Society is a society of stamp collectors who specialize in the postage stamps and postal history of Poland.

== Location ==
The members of the Polonus Philatelic Society are located throughout the USA and in several foreign countries. The society may be contacted via mail sent to: Polonus Philatelic Society, P.O. Box 60438, Rossford, Ohio, 43460-0438.

== Charter ==
The Polonus Philatelic Society is a 501 (c)(3)not-for-profit organization incorporated in 1939 in the state of Illinois. The Society is organized exclusively for educational purposes with the objective of promoting Polish philately through the dissemination of information in the English language.

== Polish philately ==
The society’s interests cover all aspects of Polish postage stamps and stamped covers.

== Study groups ==
Current study groups within the society center on:

- POW Camps
- DP/Intern Camps
- Aero-Philately
- Cinderellas and Labels
- World War I

== Quarterly bulletin ==
The society issues a quarterly “Bulletin of the Polonus Philatelic Society” in the English language.

== See also ==
- Fischer catalog
- Postage stamps and postal history of Poland
- Polonus Philatelic Society
