= Postage stamps and postal history of Poland =

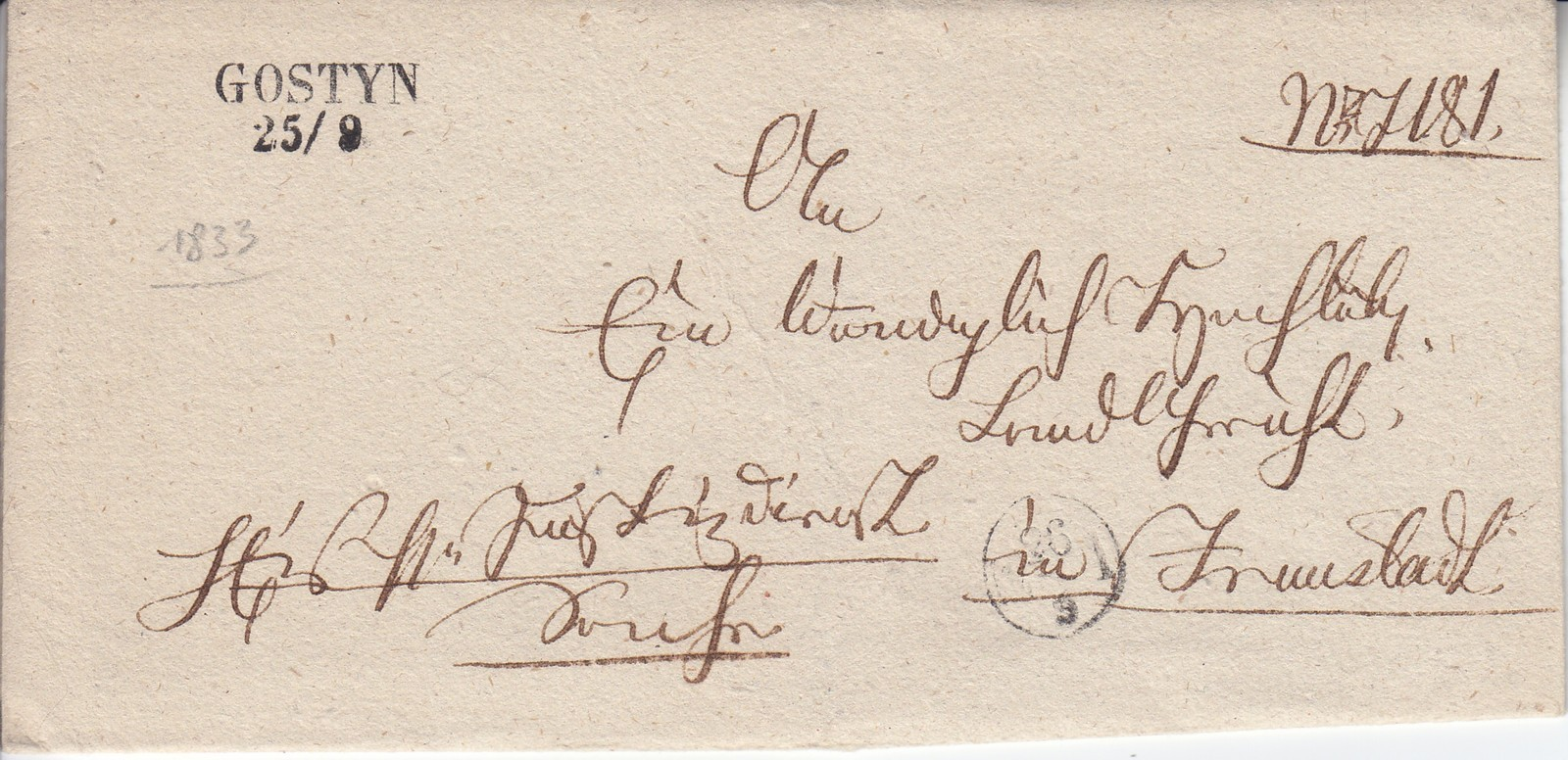
Stampless cover from Gostyń addressed to Fraustadt in 1833

Poczta Polska, the Polish postal service, was founded in 1558 and postal markings were first introduced in 1764. The three partitions of Poland in 1772, 1793 and 1795 saw the independent nation of Poland disappear. The postal services in the areas occupied by Germany and Austria were absorbed into those countries' postal services. In 1772 the area occupied by Austria was created into the Kingdom of Galicia, a part of the Austrian Empire. This lasted till 1918. The Duchy of Warsaw was created briefly, between 1807 and 1813, by Napoleon I of France, from Polish lands ceded by the Kingdom of Prussia under the terms of the Treaties of Tilsit. In 1815, following Napoleons' defeat in 1813, the Congress of Vienna, created Congress Poland out of the Duchy of Warsaw and also established the Free City of Kraków. Congress Poland was placed under the control of Russia and the postal service was given autonomy in 1815. In 1851 the postal service was put under the control of the Russian post office department regional office in St Petersburg. In 1855 control was restored for a while to the Congress Kingdom but following the uprising in 1863 again came under Russian control from 1866 and continued until World War I. In November 1918 the Second Polish Republic was created.

1958 was the 400th anniversary of the Polish postal service and was commemorated with an issue of seven stamps, a miniature sheet, a book "400 Lat Poczty Polskiej", a stamp exhibition in Warsaw and a number of commemorative postmarks.

== History ==
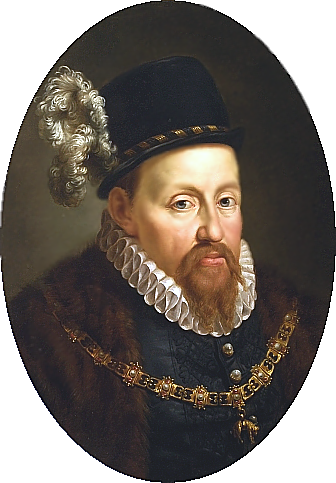
King Sigismund II Augustus established the post in 1558

The earliest record of a postal system in Poland is, from the year 1387, of merchants who organised a private system and introduced horse riders to replace foot letter carriers. In 1530 a monthly postal service from Kraków to Rome was introduced by the Fugger bankers of Venice.

On 17 October 1558 Sigismund II Augustus appointed Prospero Provano, an Italian merchant living in Kraków, to organise a postal service in Poland. He was paid 1,500 thalers per annum by the royal treasury to run the postal service. He merged all the private postal services into a single postal service. Royal mail and mail from some monastic orders was carried free. All other mail was paid for.

Meanwhile, since 1516, the house of Thurn and Taxis had been running an international postal delivery service. The Polish King decided to transfer the Polish postal system to the Taxis family and did this on 11 July 1562. Christopher Taxis received the same annual salary as Provano. He ran the system as a commercial venture and because of his extravagance the postal system deteriorated. Sigismund II Augustus terminated the contract with the Taxis family.

On 9 January 1564 Peter Moffon was appointed postmaster general by the Polish King. Moffon, another Italian merchant living in Kraków, was given the postal contract for five years. On 15 June 1569 he was replaced by Sebastiano Montelupi. When King Sigismund Augustus died in 1572, Montelupi continued the service at his own expense for two years. The public postal service then ceased for a period of some 11 years, although a system reserved to royal use was rebuilt from 1574 onwards.

On 29 January 1583 Sebastiano Montelupi and his nephew (and adopted heir), Valerio Montelupi, were given a contract to run the postal service for five years. When giving the contract the King, Stefan Batory, introduced a uniform postal rate of 4 groszy per letter not exceeding 1 łut (about 12.66 grams) for any distance in Poland. This was the first uniform postal rate to be introduced in the world. Sebastiano Montelupi died in 1600 aged 84 and Valerio Montelupi continued to run the postal service till his death in 1613.

== Free City of Kraków ==
In 1815 the Free City of Kraków had a population of 95,000, of whom 23,000 were actually in Kraków, the remainder in the surrounding area. Under the constitution that it had been given the city was responsible for the post.

A central post office was already in existence, from the period when Kraków was part of the Duchy of Warsaw. On 1 June 1816 the Post Office of the Free City of Kraków took control of the existing central post office. Its staff consisted of a director, four secretarial staff, two postmen and a conductor. Two post stations were established in Krzeszowice and Cło. Post routes to and from each of the three Polish areas, Galicia, Congress Poland and Prussia were soon established.

Under the constitution the Free City had the exclusive right to private mail. The three powers could only transport official mail. However, on 1 December 1816 the Prussian Government set up a post office and a mail delivery from Kraków to Prussia. Despite protests from the Free City the Prussians continued. On 16 May 1818 the Austrians followed suit, set up a post office and a mail delivery to Galicia.

In the first full financial year, 1816/17, the Kraków post office had a profit of 18,887 złoty. By 1822/23, because of the competition, this had reduced to 2,802 złoty, despite the increase in population and increase in traffic.

The delivery of letters was undertaken by two postmen, they collected 4 groszy for each letter delivered or 8 groszy if it was a money letter. In 1825 these fees were reduced by half.

In the year 1833/4 the Kraków post office dealt with a total of 66,910 letters, an average of 185 per day. In December 1834 the senate of the Free City of Kraków received a notice from Congress Poland that they would be setting up a post office in Kraków. Protests brought no result. In August 1836 the Free City of Kraków came to an agreement with Congress Poland to cease operating their own post office and to rent their post office building to them from 1837. In return Kraków was to receive an annual fee of 12,000 złoty.

The Prussian post office used three different date stamps (1) a two line handstamp, (2) a two ring cancel and (3) a single ring cancel – all with KRAKAU and the date. The Austrian post office used a single line handstamp with the text CRACAU. The Congress Poland post office used two datestamps one with a single outer ring and one with a double outer ring with text KRAKÓW.

== Postmarks of the Congress Kingdom ==
From 1815 the postmarks were in Polish. From 1860 the postmarks were in Russian and Polish. From 1871 the postmarks were with Russian inscriptions only.

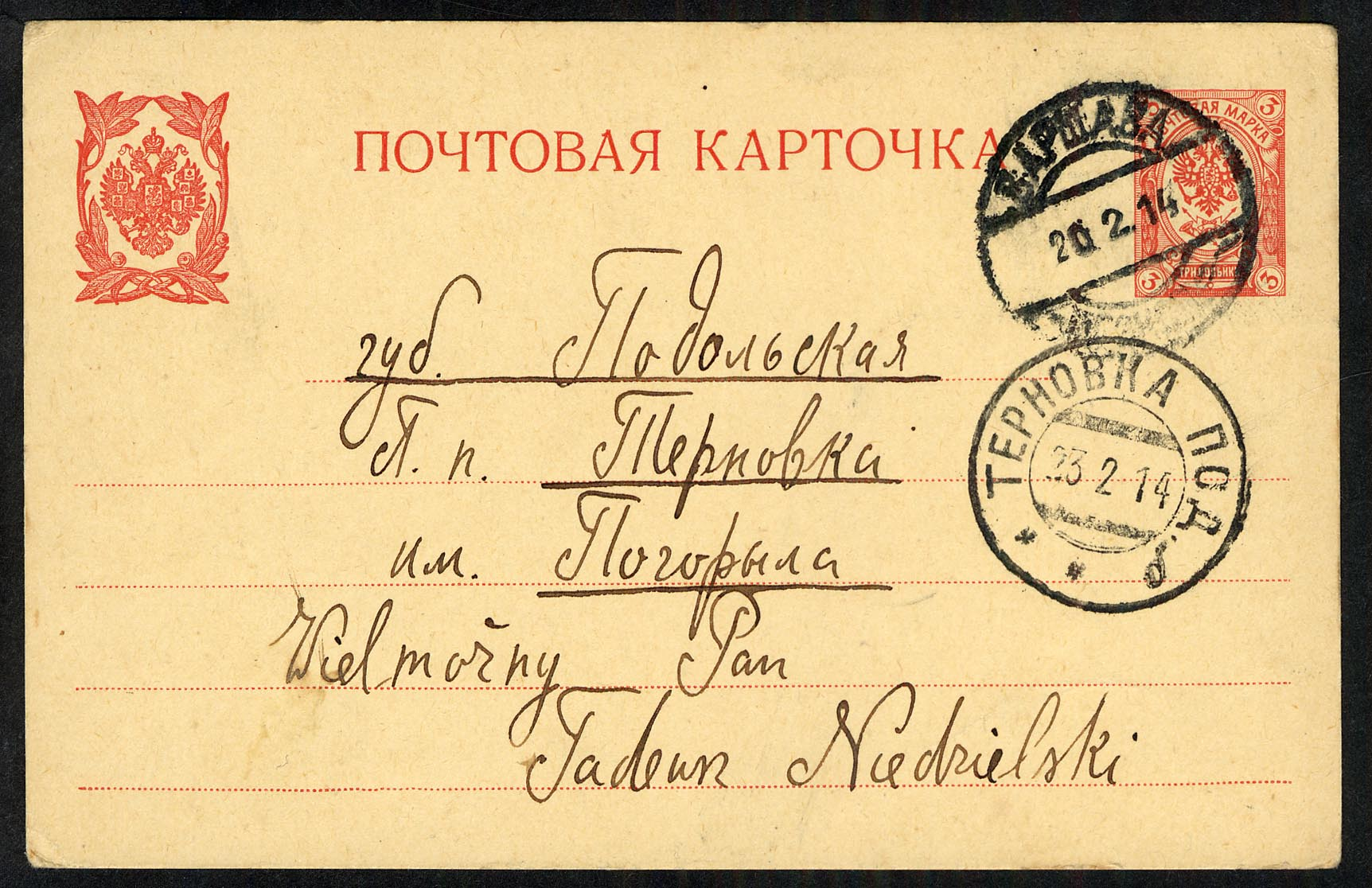
Russian postcard used from Warsaw to Ternowka 20.2.1914. Circular postmark, Russian inscription only.

The different types of standard postmarks that were used are as follows:

- One-line inscription in Polish – earliest known is 1821, latest is 1870
- One-line inscription in Polish in rectangular frame – earliest 1829, latest 1870
- Two-line inscription, with town name in Polish and date in Latin – earliest 1814, latest 1844
- Two-line inscription in Russian and Polish – earliest 1860, latest 1870
- Two-line inscription in Russian and Polish in rectangular frame – earliest 1860, latest 1870
- Two-line inscription in Russian – earliest 1871, latest 1890
- Three-line inscription in Russian in rectangular frame – earliest 1871, latest 1877
- Circular postmark with inscription in Polish and two-line date in numerals – earliest 1829, latest 1868
- Circular postmark with inscription in Russian and Polish and two-line date in numerals, earliest 1860, latest 1870
- Circular postmark with inscription in Russian – latest 1917
- Four concentric circles with a number in the centre, the number denoting the post office – earliest 1858, latest 1870

Other rare non-standard postmarks are also known.

== First Polish stamp ==
Poland Number 1

The first Polish stamp was issued for the Congress Kingdom on 1 January 1860 (Gregorian calendar). Because 1 January was a Sunday the stamp was not actually available until the following day. The design was similar to the contemporary Russian stamps with the arms of the Congress Kingdom in the centre. The engraving was done by the Polish Bank engraver Henryk Mejer. The drawings he used were found in the archives at St Petersburg but the name of the artist remains unknown. The stamps were printed by the government printers in Warsaw on the orders of the Congress Kingdom postal service. The letterpress machine used was invented by Izrael Abraham Staffel (1814–1884) for printing in two colours. The machine was capable of printing 1,000 sheets per hour and it had a counting device which ensured an accurate count. Apart from these facts very little more is known about the machine.

The printing was done without consultation of the Russian postal service. The regional office in St Petersburg only approved afterwards, on 4 March 1860 (Gregorian calendar). These stamps could only be used within the Congress Kingdom and to Russia. Letters to other countries had to be paid for in cash and unstamped. It is believed that some three million of these stamps were printed. When the stamps were withdrawn from use on 1 April 1865 (Gregorian calendar) a total of 208,515 stamps were destroyed; Russian stamps had to be used from that day onwards.

In 1915 the Congress Kingdom was occupied by the Central Powers.

== Austrian occupation 1915–1918 ==
Austria occupied the southern part of Congress Poland; no special stamps were issued; Austrian stamps were made available. Austrian field post offices were set up which used postmarks with Polish town names.

The stamps that were made available were:

- Most of the Austro-Hungarian Military Post general issues from 1915 to 1918 – 75 different stamps
- Some of the Bosnia and Herzegovina issues from the period 1904 to 1916 – 41 different stamps
- Some of the Austria issues from the period 1908 to 1916 – 42 different stamps

In addition one postcard from Bosnia and Herzegovina and four postcards of the Austro-Hungarian Military Post general issues were made available.

Russian datestamps were replaced with Austrian datestamps. The postmarks were inscribed K. u. K. ETAPPENPOSTAMT at the top and the Polish town name at the bottom.

The list of post office with these datestamps are as under, names in bracket are changes in name which took place later

- Annopol Lubelski
- Belchatów
- Bełżyce
- Bialobrzegi Kreis Radom
- Bilgoraj
- Busk in Polen
- Chęciny
- Chmielnik
- Cholm (Chełm)
- Dąbrowa in Polen
- DębIin in Polen
- Działoszyce
- Działoszyn
- Gorzkowice
- Granica
- Grubleszow (Hrubieszów)
- lłza
- Iwaniska in Polen
- Janów in Polen
- Jedlińsk
- Jędrzejów
- Kazimierza Wielka
- Kielce
- Klimontów
- Klomnice
- Koniecpol
- Końsk
- Koprzywnica
- Kozienice
- Kraśnik
- Krasnostaw
- Lipsko
- Lubartów
- Lublin
- Łaszczów
- Łęczna
- Miechów
- Nowa Brzeżnica
- Nowoaleksandrya (Pulawy)
- Noworadomsk
- Nowy Korczyn
- Olkusz
- Opatów in Polen
- Opoczno in Polen
- Opole Kreis Pulawy
- Ossyaków
- Ostrowiec
- Ozarów Kreis Opatów in Polen
- Pajęczno
- Piaski Kreis Lublin
- Pilica
- Pińczów
- Piotrków
- Pradła
- Proszowice
- Przedbórz Kreis Końsk
- Przysucha
- Puławy
- Radom
- Radoszyce Kreis Końsk
- Rudniki
- Sandomierz
- Silniczka
- Skała in Polen
- Skalbmierz
- Skaryszew in Polen
- Skarżysko
- Sławków in Polen
- Słomniki
- Solec Kreis Wierzbnik
- Staszów
- Stopnica
- Strzemieszyce
- Suchedniów
- SuIejów
- Szczebrzeszyn
- Szczekociny
- Szczerców
- Szydlow
- Szydłowiec
- Tarnogród
- Tomaszów Kreis Tomaszów
- Wąwolnica
- Widawa
- Wierzbnik
- Włoszczowa
- Wodzisław
- Wolborz
- Wolbrom
- Zaklików
- Zamość
- Zawichost
- Zwierzyniec Kreis Zamość
- Żarki

== German occupation 1915–1918 ==
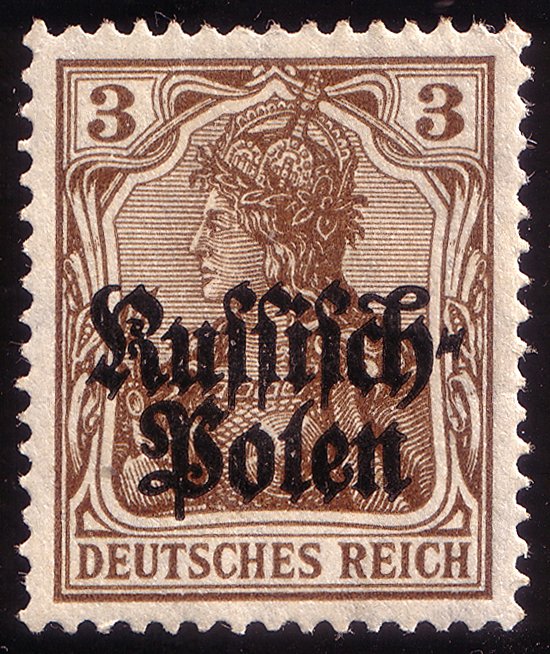
3pf German stamp overprinted "Russisch-Polen"

The area occupied by Germany was named "General Government Warsaw" (General-Gouvernement Warschau).

On 12 May 1915, five contemporary German stamps, overprinted "Russisch-Polen", by the Imperial Printing Works in Berlin, were first issued for use in the German-occupied area. On 1 August 1916, after the fall of Warsaw and the complete occupation of central Poland, a set 11 stamps overprinted "Gen.-Gouv. Warschau" was issued. They remained in use until November 1918. These stamps only ensured delivery to the post office and not to the addressee.

In addition to stamps, postal stationery items were also overprinted and made available. One postcard and one reply postcard were issued overprinted "Russisch-Polen". Three different postcards and two different reply postcards were issued with the "Gen.-Gouv. Warschau" overprint.

Stamped to order postal stationery was also produced with the "Russisch-Polen" overprint. Items produced were – three different values of postcards (3pf, 5pf, 10pf); five different values of pre paid envelopes (3pf, 5pf, 10pf, 20pf, 40pf); and one 3pf newspaper wrapper. The postcards and envelopes were produced with and without an illustration.

=== Kingdom of Poland essays ===
In 1916, Germany and Austria declared a new Kingdom of Poland. Early in 1917 the Germans requested the Chief of the Civil Administration in Warsaw to arrange for the Warszawskie Towarzystwo Artystyczne (Warsaw Society of Artists) to organise a competition of designs, by Polish designers, for a series of definitive stamps for this planned Kingdom of Poland. One of the conditions of this competition was that the stamps be inscribed "KROLESTWO POLSKIE" (literally: Polish Kingdom, i.e. Kingdom of Poland). Monetary prizes were offered from 150 marks to 1000 marks. The closing date was 1 December 1917. A total of 32 artists submitted some 148 designs by the closing date. Essays of all of these 148 designs were printed on sheets in black, brown, green and blue. A booklet was also published on 11 January 1918 containing all these designs.

Thirteen of these designs were chosen and the Imperial Printing Works in Berlin engraved all of the designs. The 13 chosen designs were printed in the proposed colours on 5 sheets. These stamps were mounted in folders and circulated amongst the various German embassies and legations in existence at the time.

The artists include the following: M Bystydzieński, Henyk Oderfeld, Nikodem Romanus, Józef Tom, Apoloniusz Kędzierski, Ludwik Gardowski, Ludwik Sokołowski, Zygmunt Beniulis, Jan Ogorkiewicz, Edmund John, Edward Trojanowski and Mieczysław Neufeld.

When in 1918 Poland became independent, two of the artists, who took part in the 1917 competition, Edward Trojanowski and Edmund Bartłomiejczyk, were asked to modify their designs for use by the new Republic of Poland.

== Local postal services 1915–1918 ==
The occupying forces did not provide any local delivery service; they left it to town council set up local delivery services. Some of these councils produced stamps for providing this service others used cachets, which were stamped on the letters. Most of the stamps which were issued, were produced without permission of the occupying authorities. None of these were valid for use once Polish stamps had been issued in November 1918.

The list of local postal services which used stamps and/or handstamps for local deliveries is as follows:

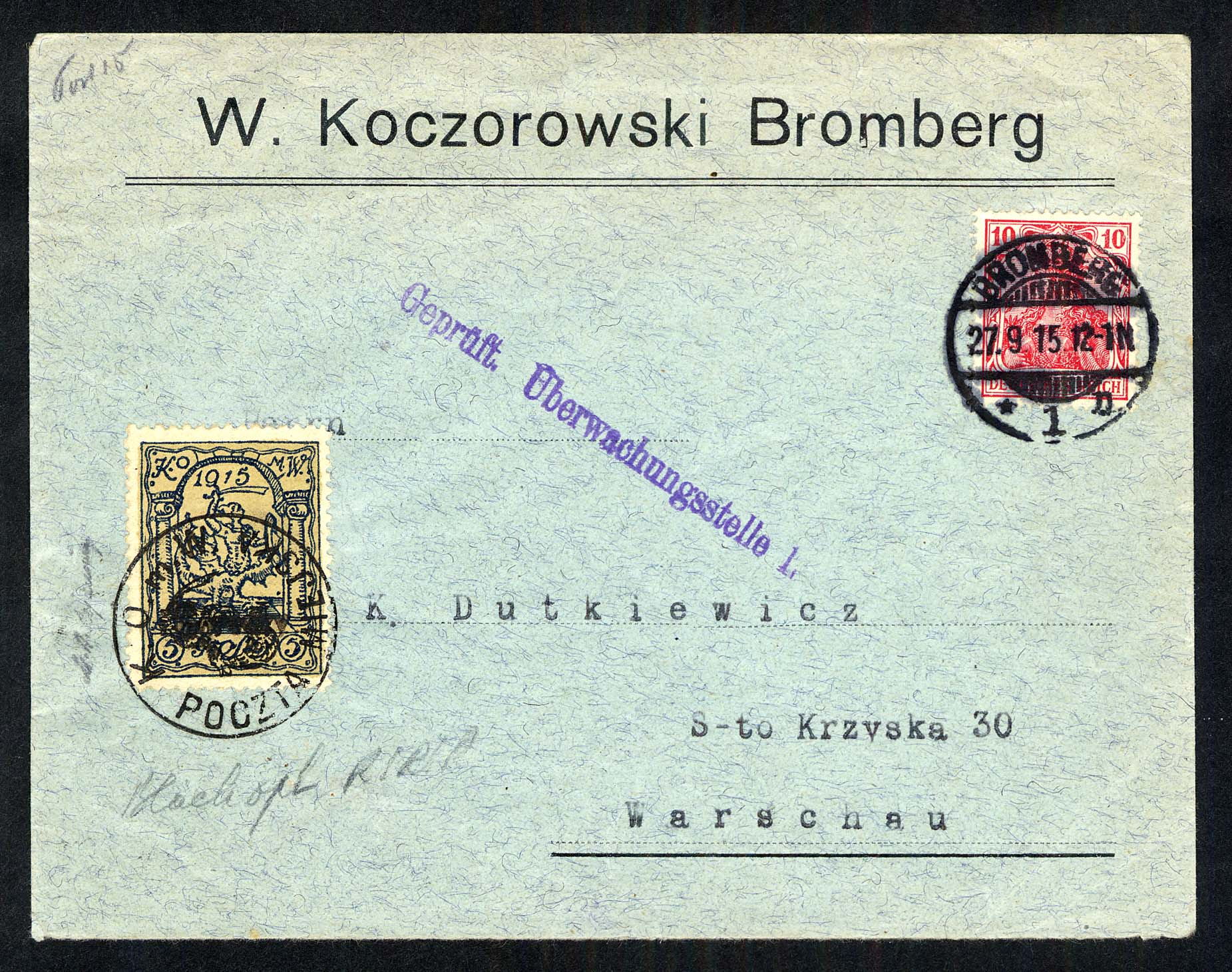
Warsaw local post stamp applied to a cover from Bromberg. The signature to the left side of this stamp is that of M A Bojanowicz, author of The Kingdom of Poland. Poland No 1 and associated Postal History.

- Aleksandrów – handstamp
- Będzin – handstamps
- Chęciny – 8 stamps issued unofficially; considered as fantasy stamps
- Czeladż – handstamp
- Częstochowa – handstamps
- Grodno – handstamp
- Kalisz – 2 handstamps
- Koło – handstamps
- Lipno – handstamp
- Luboml – 7 stamps ordered and printed, arrived too late to be used
- Łódź – handstamps
- Mława – handstamp
- Otwock – 1 stamp and handstamps
- Pabiannice – handstamp
- Pruszków – handstamps
- Przedbórz – 18 stamps recognized as being issued
- Siedlce – handstamps
- Sosnowiec – 7 different stamps issued and handstamps
- Skierniewice – handstamp
- Tomaszów Mazowiecki – handstamp
- Warsaw – 10 different stamps and handstamps
- Wilno – handstamps
- Włocławek – handstamp
- Wysokie Mazowieckie – handstamp
- Zawiercie – 2 stamps
- Żarki – 9 stamps issued
- Żyrardów – handstamp

== Polish Republic provisional issues ==
The generally accepted date of the independence of Poland is 11 November 1918. This date really only applies to General-Gouvernement Warschau. The area occupied by Austria was freed on 29 October 1918. The Wielkopolska area was held by the Germans till 27 December 1918 and the Pomorze area till 10 February 1919. Each area had a different philatelic history until stamps were issued to cover the whole country.

=== Former German occupied Russian area ===
Following the Armistice on 11 November 1918 the Polish authorities set to work to organise a postal service. Instructions were issued to temporarily use existing stamps and modify or replace cancelling machines with Polish place names. Many offices, on their own initiative, overprinted the "Russisch-Polen" and the "Gen.-Gouv. Warschau" stamps with "Poczta Polska", "Na Skarb Narodowy" etc.

==== Local overprints ====
Local overprints, on the "Russisch-Polen" and the "Gen.-Gouv. Warschau" stamps, are known from the following locations.

- Aleksandrów Kujawski – 11 different stamps known used from 18 November 1918 to 3 January 1919.
- Błonie – 11 stamps and two postcards were overprinted using a rubber stamp; all known copies are of philatelic origin.
- Brzeziny – 14 stamps and two postcards were overprinted; all known copies are of philatelic origin.
- Ciechocinek – 6 different stamps are known overprinted; the copies are dated between 13 and 22 December 1918. Only used copies are known. Only two to ten of each of these are known (per 2001 catalogue). These are the highest priced Polish stamps.
- Grodzisk – 11 different stamps and two postcards were overprinted; all known copies are of philatelic origin.
- Izbica – 4 different stamps are known overprinted.
- Kalisz – 15 different stamps were overprinted by the post office in Kalisz. Four other different overprints using rubber handstamps supplied by a philatelic dealer were used on ten different stamps to produce 40 different items; these are considered philatelic.
- Koło – 10 different stamps and one postcard are known to have been overprinted with two different handstamps.
- Konin – Two different overprints were used on 10 different stamps to produce 20 items. A different overprint in January 1919 was used; all known items with this third overprint are philatelic.
- Luzino – known from 2 covers dated 1922
- Łęczyca – 14 different stamps and two postcards were overprinted.
- Łowicz – 11 different stamps and one postcard were overprinted, all used items are postmarked February or March 1919 which is after definitive stamps had been supplied.
- Łuków – Two stamps and one postcard are known to have been supplied from 12 December 1918.
- Maków – 10 different stamps and one postcard are known used from 13 November 1918 to 5 January 1919.
- Ostrołęka – 8 different stamps and two postcards were overprinted. They are known used from 12 November 1918.
- Ostrów Mazowiecka – 9 different stamps and two postcards were overprinted. They are known used from 12 November 1918.
- Otwock – all items believed to be philatelic.
- Ozorków – 10 different stamps and one postcard were overprinted. These are believed to be philatelic.
- Poddębice – 10 different stamps and two postcards were overprinted. These were in use during December 1918.
- Płońsk – 11 stamps overprinted, these are found only used and are believed to be philatelic.
- Pułtusk – 10 different stamps and two postcards were overprinted. These are known used from 13 November 1918 to early January 1919.
- Sieradz – 10 different stamps and two postcards were overprinted. These were in use from 13 November 1918 till the end of January 1919.
- Skierniewice – 11 different stamps and two postcards were overprinted in black red and blue. These are considered as philatelic.
- Włocławek – Two different overprints and 13 different stamps were used to produce 23 different items. Two postcards were overprinted producing 4 items. They were in use from 13 November 1918.
- Zduńska Wola – Two different overprints and 8 different stamps were used to produce 17 different items. Two postcards were also overprinted. These were in use from 13 November 1918 till February 1919.

==== First provisional issue ====
The first stamps to be issued by newly established Polish Ministry of Post and Telecommunications in Warsaw were on 17 November 1918. Unissued stamps, which had been produced for the Warsaw Local Post in 1916, were overprinted with the value in "fen" at the top and "Poczta Polska" at the bottom. This is the first known occasion, in the world, on which local stamps were utilised to produce state stamps. They were in use for only a few weeks. The most common postmark to be found on these stamps is "Warschau", "Warszawa" and "Łódź", stamps postmarked "Bendzin" and "Sosnowice" are also known.

The four stamps which were produced were:

- 5 fen on 2 gr brown – statue of Sigismund III Vasa
- 10 fen on 6 gr green – "Syrena" the coat of arms of Warsaw
- 25 fen on 10 gr carmine – White Eagle of Poland
- 50 fen on 20 gr blue – statue of John III Sobieski

The original stamps had been designed by Professor Edward Trojanowski and printed lithograph at the printing works of Jan Cotty in Warsaw. The overprinting was done at the "Kopytowski i Ska" printing works in Warsaw. Each of the four stamps is known with inverted overprint.

The total number of stamps originally printed in 1916, per the invoice from the printers, was as follows

- 2 groszy – 874,152
- 6 groszy – 1,814,400
- 10 groszy – 290,952
- 20 groszy – 209,952

About 20,000 of each of these were not used for overprinting with "Poczta Polska" in 1918.

==== Second provisional issue ====
A large stock of the "Gen. Gouv. Warschau" stamps had been left behind by the Germans. These were collected up and overprinted with obliterating bars and "Poczta Polska". On 5 December 1918 eight different values (3, 5, 10, 15, 20, 30, 40 and 60 fen) were put on sale in post offices and shops. The supply of 5 fen stamps ran out after two days, so stamps with a face value of 2½ and 3 fen were surcharged "5". In addition to this a 25 fen stamp was issued by surcharging the 7½ value with "25". Due to the haste with which these stamps were produced there are many errors and varieties to be found. The overprinting was done by the "Kopytowski i Ska" private printing works in Warsaw.

On 7 December 1918 the Ministry of Post and Telegraph announced in the daily newspapers that German stamps and postcards without the overprint "Poczta Polska" would not be accepted for postage as from 16 December 1918.

=== Former Austrian occupied Congress Poland ===
Poland first Lublin overprint 10 hal stamp

On 5 November 1918 the Post and Telegraph Administration in Lublin issued the first instructions regarding the organising of the post in the Congress Poland area formerly occupied by the Austrians. All the post office were instructed to follow existing rules and regulations and to use existing Austrian stamps in stock. Three post offices on their own initiative overprinted Austrian stamps and the Lublin Post and Telegraph Administration supplied overprinted Austrian stamps in December 1918. There is no record of a public announcement or any instruction being given to post offices invalidating Austrian stamps.

==== Local overprints ====
Local overprints are known as follows, the status of all of these is unknown

- Jędrzejów – overprint on some 13 different postage stamps, one postcard and one postage due stamp.
- Olkusz – overprint on some 12 different postage stamps and one postage due stamp.
- Zwierzyniec nad Wieprzem – three different stamps overprinted.

==== First Lublin provisional issue ====
Three values (10 hal, 20 hal and 45 hal) of the Austro-Hungarian K und K Military Post Imperial Welfare Fund stamps were overprinted in Lublin with POLSKA at top, Polish eagle in centre and POCZTA at the bottom. A total of 64,000 copies of each was overprinted. The stamps were distributed to 41 post offices and shops. All the stamps were sold within ten days of being issued on 5 December 1918. Due to the haste of production errors such as inverted overprints and double overprints are known.

==== Second Lublin provisional issue ====
Ten different values were produced using the Austro-Hungarian K und K Military Post Emperor Charles stamps and were issued on 19 December 1918. As with the previous issue, numerous varieties exist due to the haste of production. The stamps overprinted and quantities are as follows

- 3 on 3 hal – 13,000
- 3 on 15 hal – 164,600
- 10 on 30 hal – 136,600
- 25 on 40 hal – 109,900
- 45 on 60 hal – 91,800
- 45 on 80 hal – 50,000 with bars
- 45 on 80 hal – 154,900 with stars
- 50 on 60 hal – 75,000
- 50 hal – 22,000
- 90 hal – 108,800

=== Former Austrian Kingdom of Galicia ===
On the departure of the Austrian forces the area was administered by a governing commission which was called the Polish Liquidation Commission (Polska Komisja Likwidacyjna) which was formed on 28 October 1918, in Kraków, by a coalition of Polish political parties in Galicia.

==== Local overprints ====
A number of post offices are known to have overprinted or handstamped Austrian stamps. Many of these stamps did see proper postal use. There are also many that are only known off cover and/or on philatelic covers; these are considered as speculative issues. Details of the post offices with local overprints are as follows

- Baranów – handstamp on 14 different values.
- Bielsko – handstamp on two different postcards.
- Bochnia – three stamps were overprinted but not used.
- Czermin – handstamp on two different stamps.
- Dziedzice – handstamp on two different stamps.
- Klimkówka – handstamp on two different stamps.
- Krosno – one postcard overprinted.
- Mielec – 19 different stamps, three postcards and a letter card are known to have been overprinted or handstamped and used non-philatelically. There are in addition some 100 different stamps that are considered as speculative issues.
- Oświęcim – handstamp on one stamp.
- Skałat – 24 different stamps were handstamped.
- Węgierska Górka – one cover known, handstamped, dated 3 February 1919. and two cuts off with 5 stamps each.

All the stamps with local overprints from the following post offices are considered as speculative issues

- Myślenice
- Przemyśl
- Rozwadów
- Świątniki Górne
- Tarnów

==== Krakow issue ====
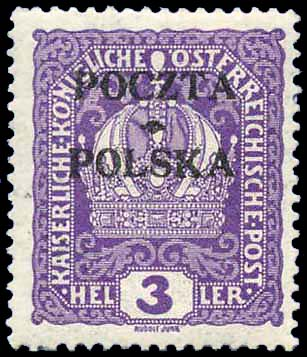
Kraków issue 3 hal stamp

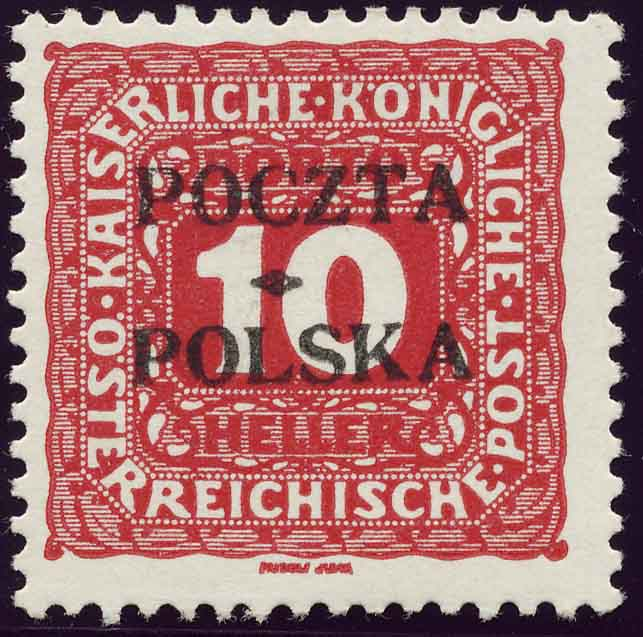
Kraków issue 10 hal postage due stamp

All Austrian stamps, which were still in store in Kraków, were sent to two different printers in Kraków for overprinting on 2 January 1919. The two printing works were A Koziański and F Zieliński. The overprinting by Koziański was by typograph and the overprinting by Zieliński was by lithograph. In total 20 different postage stamps, 5 different newspaper stamps and 12 different postage due stamps were overprinted with POCZTA POLSKA in two lines with a diamond shape or an ornament between. The stamps were made available for sale from 10 January 1919.

The following stamps and quantities of postage stamps were produced and issued.

- 3hal −2,350
- 5 hal −2,050
- 6 hal −28,800
- 10 hal −2,250
- 12 hal −15,640
- 15 hal −62,750
- 20 hal −5,340
- 25 hal −1,150
- 25/80 hal −100,000
- 30 hal −3,740
- 40 hal −22,390
- 50 hal −58,230
- 60 hal −67,020
- 80 hal −74,190
- 90 hal −1,300
- 1 kr – 50,860
- 2 kr −90,275
- 3 kr −8,005
- 4 kr −5,508
- 10 kr – 440

On 12 January 1919 the Post and Telegraph Director in Lwów issued instructions that unoverprinted Austrian stamps and postal stationery would not be valid for postage from 20 January 1919.

==== Polish Liquidation Commission issue ====
The Polish Liquidation Commission ordered these stamps, popularly known as the Polish Liquidation Commission issue, for use in Galicia. They were issued on 25 February 1919 and the sale of these stamps was stopped while the Polish Liquidation Commission argued with the Ministry of Post and Telegraph in Warsaw over the competence of the Galicia administration issuing stamps. This argument was resolved in a matter of days and the stamps were allowed to be sold from March with the proviso that these stamps would only be valid for use till 31 May 1919. The stamp was designed by Jan Michalski and printed in the Zieliński printing works in Kraków. They were issued ungummed and imperforate.

The following stamps and quantities were produced and issued.

- 2 hal grey – 501,000
- 3 hal violet – 400,850
- 5 hal green – 980,050
- 6 hal orange – 100,450
- 10 hal carmine – 1,004,050
- 15 hal brown – 1,504,850
- 20 hal olive – 602,650
- 25 hal red – 3,008,550
- 50 hal indigo – 806,650
- 70 hal blue – 501,150
- 1 kr red and grey – 408,000

== See also ==
- Bojanowicz Collection
- Fischer catalog
- Kaluski Collection
- Polonus Philatelic Society
- Postage stamps and postal history of Żarki
- Postage stamps and postal history of Danzig

== References and sources ==
Notes

Sources

- Bojanowicz, M A, The Kingdom of Poland. Poland No 1 and associated Postal History, 1979, The Royal Philatelic Society London
- Kamienski, Miet, Postal Service between Poland and the Mediterranean, (page 31 to 41 in The Mediterranean Mails, 1993, Philatelic Specialists Society of Canada)
- 400 Lat Poczty Polskiej, 1958, Wydawnictwa Komunikacyine Warsaw (in Polish)
- Larking, R N W, Poland The postal issues during and after the Great War, Gibbons Stamp Monthly, published in 22 parts starting in October 1929 and finishing in August 1932.
- Polskie Znaki Pocztowe, Vol I, 1960; Vol II, 1960; Vol III, 1962; Vol IV, 1966; Vol V, 1973, Biuro Wydawnicze Ruch, Warsaw (in Polish), the joint work of Stanisław Adamski, Stanisław Babiński, Tadeusz Grodecki, Tadeusz Gryżewski, Tadeusz Hampel, Maxymilian Herwich, Antoni Łaszkiewicz (joint ed.), Józef Machowski, Stanisław Mikstein, Zbigniew Mikulski (joint ed.), Maciej Perzyński, Józef Tislowitz and Stanisław Żółkiewski.
- Śnieżko, Aleksander, Poczta Miejska Miasta St. Warszawy 1915–1918, Agencja Wydawnicza Ruch, 1965 (in Polish)
- Fischer, Andrzej, Katalog Polskich Znaków Pocztowych, 2001, Vol 2, Andrzej Fischer, ISBN 83-88352-10-5
- Ilustrowany Katalog Znaczkow Polskich, 1973, Agencja Wydawnicza Ruch, Warsaw (in Polish)
- Melnichak, Michael E, The Typographic Overprints of the 1919 Krakow Issues of Poland, 1990, (self published)
