= Clive Akerman =

English philatelist

Geoffrey Clive Akerman (28 September 1939 – 24 September 2013) was an English philatelist. In 2001, Akerman and Gavin H. Fryer won the Crawford Medal from The Royal Philatelic Society London for their work "The Reform of the Post Office in the Victorian Era and Its Impact on Economic and Social Activity". He won numerous other awards for displays at stamp exhibitions. In 2009, Akerman won the Revenue Society Research Medal.

Akerman was a fellow of the Royal Philatelic Society London and editor of The Revenue Journal, the journal of The Revenue Society. He was an expert on the revenue stamps of Argentina and his multi-volume catalogue of those stamps has become the definitive work on the subject.

Akerman produced books and written articles for philatelic journals, including The American Revenuer, The Revenue Journal of Great Britain, The Mainsheet, The London Philatelist, Gibbons Stamp Monthly and The GB Journal.

== Selected publications ==
- Index to principal plate varieties in One Penny imperforate, Great Britain Philatelic Society, 1968.
- The plating of the half penny 1887-1900: An allocation of the printing flaws found on these issues to a series of printing plates, Great Britain Philatelic Society, London, 1970.
- The revenue stamps of Argentina (Alnis guides), Glass Slipper, York, 1994. ISBN 1-85829-024-4.
- Collecting and displaying revenue stamps, Revenue Society of Great Britain, Hitchin, 1995. ISBN 0-9525123-0-0.
- Judicial Stamps of Great Britain and Pre-1922 Ireland, Revenue Society of Great Britain, Hitchin, 1997. (With Roger G.Booth) ISBN 0-9525123-1-9.
- The Reform of the Post Office in the Victorian Era and Its Impact on Economic and Social Activity, Royal Philatelic Society London, 2000. ISBN 0-900631-36-8. (With Gavin H. Fryer)
- The Presentation of Revenue Stamps: Taxes and Duties in South America, The Revenue Society of Great Britain, 2002.
- The Revenue Stamps of Peru, Clive Akerman, 2nd edition, 2007. (With Herbert H. Moll)
- The Revenue Stamps of Bolivia, Clive Akerman, 2nd edition, 2010. (With Albert W. Hilchey)

The Revenue Stamps of Argentina:

- The Revenue Stamps of Argentina Vol.I, 2nd edition, 2002. (The Provinces and Municipalities of Buenos Aires)
- The Revenue Stamps of Argentina Vol.II, 1st edition, 1999. (The Provinces and Municipalities of Catamarca to Corrientes) ISBN 0-9525123-2-7
- The Revenue Stamps of Argentina Vol.III, 1st edition, 2000. (The Provinces and Municipalities of Entre to Neuquen) ISBN 0-9525123-3-5
- The Revenue Stamps of Argentina Vol.IV, 1st edition, 2002. (The Provinces and Municipalities of Salta to San Luis plus Santa Fe) ISBN 0-9525123-5-1
- The Revenue Stamps of Argentina Vol.V, 1st edition, 2002. (The Provinces and Municipalities of Santa Fe part 2, Santiago del Estero & Tucuman) ISBN 0-9525123-6-X
- Revenue Stamps of the Republic of Argentina, 1st edition, 2003. (The national issues of Argentina)

== Outside philately ==
Clive Akerman was educated at the University of Bristol, graduating with a BSc in 1961, and lived in Gloucestershire, Great Britain.

== See also ==
- Revenue stamp
- Philatelists
