= The Revenue Society =

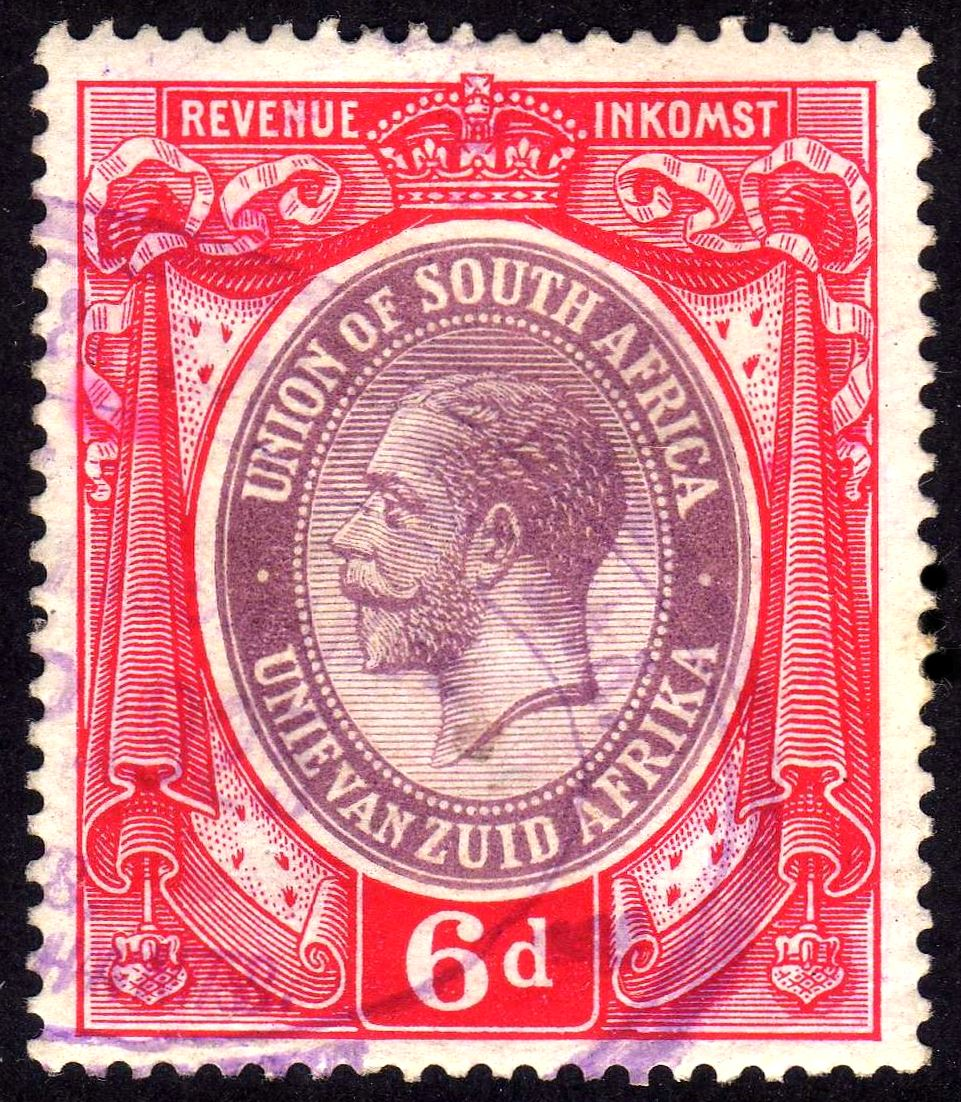
A South African revenue stamp. The sort of stamp collected by members of the Revenue Society.

The Revenue Society (originally The Revenue Society of Great Britain) was formed in 1990 and is the only international philatelic society which covers revenue stamps of the whole world. The society is also noted for the particularly high quality of its journal which has published many articles on subjects about which little or nothing has previously been written.

In 2007, the name of the society was shortened from The Revenue Society of Great Britain to just The Revenue Society in order to make the international nature of the society clear.

== Origins ==
The first committee meeting took place at the East India Club in London on 3 March 1990 and the first open meeting followed on 10 May 1990. Founder members included Robson Lowe, Gary Ryan, Clive Akerman and Ronald Butler.

There had previously been no revenue stamp society in the UK since the Fiscal Philatelic Society ceased to exist in 1928 and the only similar society in existence was The American Revenue Association. A revival of interest in revenue stamps had started since Robson Lowe began specific revenue auctions in the 1970s and the founder members of the society felt that the time was ripe for an organisation devoted just to revenues.

== Objects ==
The objects of the society are:

- To promote and encourage the collection and study of Revenue Stamps.
- To arrange meetings where members may discuss these stamps.
- To encourage the exhibition and display of these stamps.
- To publish a Journal the contents of which shall relate to revenue stamps and their usage.

== Membership ==
The membership of the society is approximately 300 from 40 countries. Approximately half the members reside outside the UK.

== Officers ==
The first president of the society was Robson Lowe. and another former president of the society was the late David Springbett.

== Journal ==
The society is particularly noted for the quarterly The Revenue Journal (originally The Revenue Journal of Great Britain) under the long-time editorship of Clive Akerman which has won several awards at philatelic shows including Vermeil medals at España 06 and China 09.

== Selected publications ==
- Collecting and Displaying Revenue Stamps by Clive Akerman, 1995.
- The judicial stamps of Great Britain and pre-1922 Ireland by Clive Akerman and Roger G. Booth, 1996.
- De La Rue's QV Revenue Heads: an illustrated study linking postage with revenues before 1881 by Peter F. Mansfield, 2000.
- Great Britain Road Tax Discs 1921-2000 by R.H. Champion, E.J. Hitchings and M. Brice, 2001.
- The presentation of revenue stamps: taxes and duties in South America; a display of Latin American revenue stamped paper, stamps and other material drawn from Gold Medal collections of Argentina and Brazil, and un-exhibited collections of Bolivia, Nicaragua, Peru and various other countries presented to The Royal Philatelic Society London, Thursday 18th October 2001 by Clive Akerman, 2002.
- Court circulars: a new perspective on Ireland Petty Sessions by Peter F. Mansfield, 2003.
- Licences and related ephemera of Great Britain 1660-1939 by R.H. Champion, E.J. Hitchings and E.A. Hall, 2004.
- The Impressed Duty Stamps of Victoria by Dingle Smith and Dave Elsmore, 2006.
- Great Britain Playing Card Tax Wrappers 1883–1960, and Waddington End of Duty Playing Card Labels by Prof. M.J. Tanner and Chris Tennant, 2007.

== Awards ==
The society awards The Revenue Society Research Medal for research into revenue stamps and a Competition Medal. The Research Medal was first awarded in 2007 and the winner was Peter Mansfield for research into British and Northern Ireland key type revenue stamps.

== See also ==
- Fiscal Philatelic Society
