= U.S. Special Delivery (postal service) =

US premium postal service

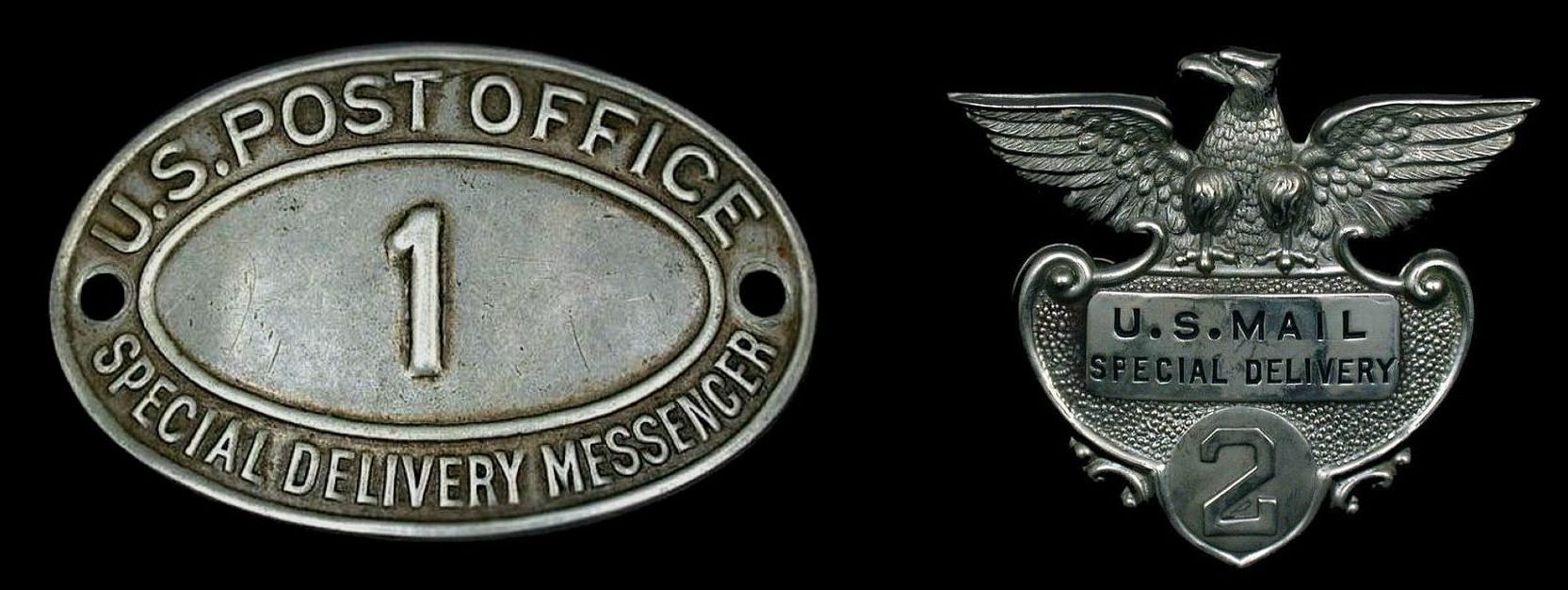
Special Delivery badges

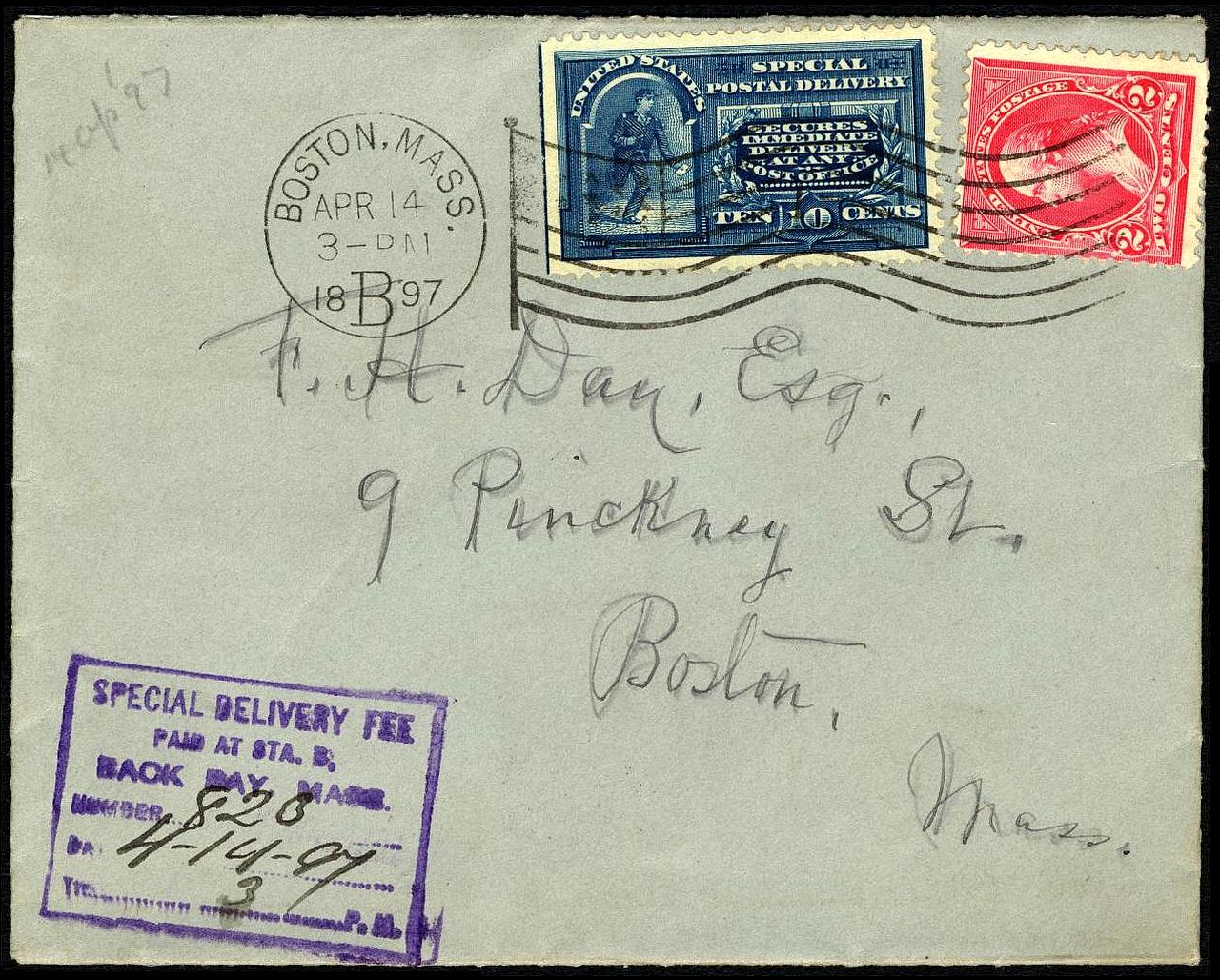
Special Delivery stamp on cover

U.S. Special Delivery was a postal service paid for with additional postage for urgent letters and postal packets which are delivered in less time than by standard or first class mail service. Its meaning is different and separate from express mail delivery service. Essentially it meant that a postal packet was delivered from a post office to the addressee immediately once it arrived at the post office responsible for delivering it, rather than waiting for the next regular delivery to the addressee.

== Origin ==
The U.S. Post Office in conjunction with the Universal Postal Union established a basis for a special service for speedier delivery of mail for an extra fee beginning in 1885. Special Delivery was at first limited to post offices that operated in townships with populations of 4,000 or more. In 1886 Congress revised Special Delivery service to all U.S. post offices. Special Delivery service was in operation from 1885 to 1997 whereby the letter would be dispatched immediately and directly from the receiving post office to the recipient rather than being put in mail for distribution on the regular delivery route.

== Special Delivery stamps ==
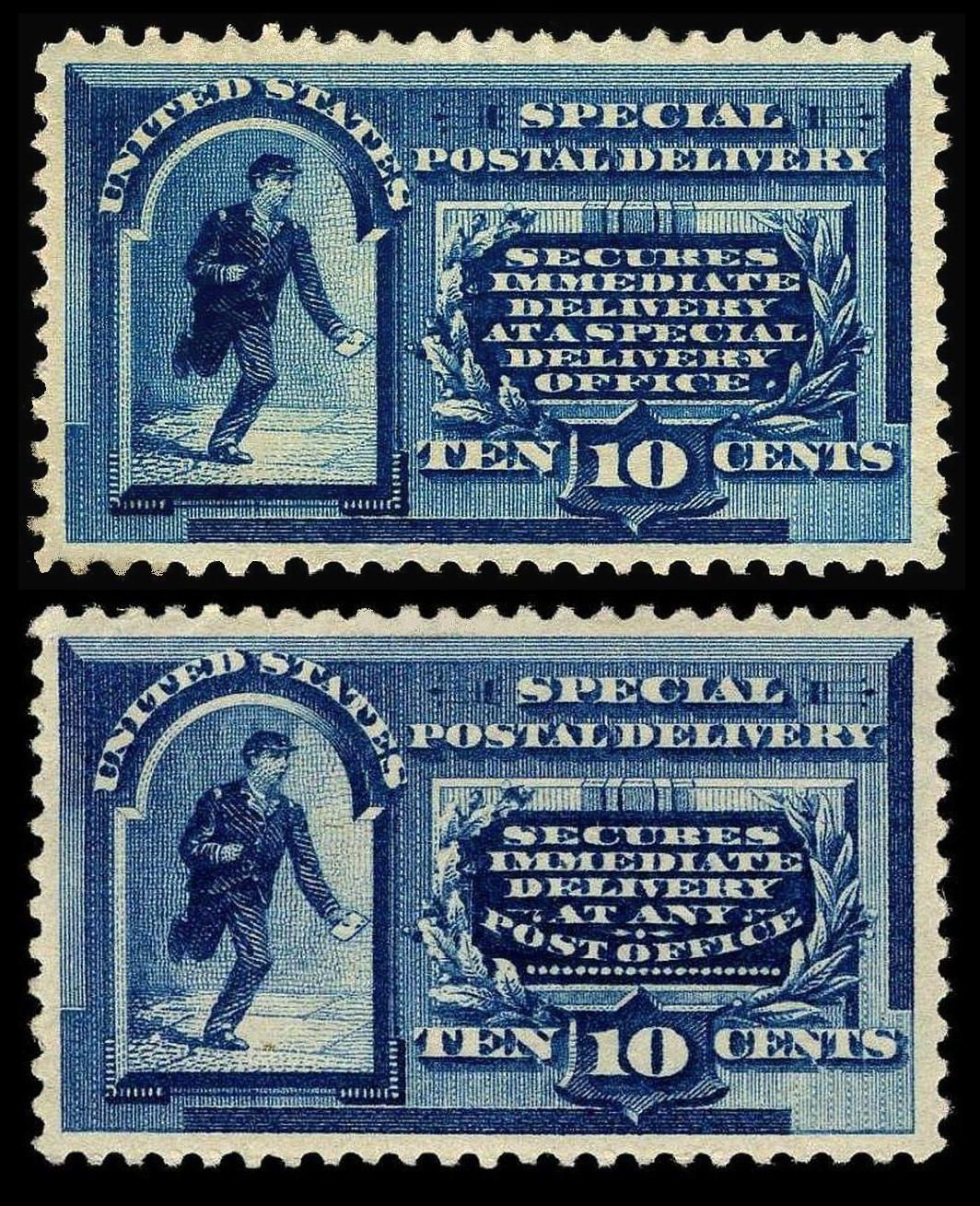
First Special Delivery stamps (two types)

In 1885 Congress enacted the use of "a special stamp of the face valuation of ten cents ... [that] when attached to a letter, in addition to the lawful postage thereon ... shall be regarded as entitling such letter to immediate delivery." The first Special delivery stamp was printed by the American Bank Note Company and issued on October 1, 1885. It could not be used to prepay postage or any other service. The stamp bears the words "Secures immediate delivery at a special delivery office,". In 1886 the Special Delivery service was expanded to all post offices and a new stamp was designed. The revised stamp was identical to the first issue of 1885 but instead bore the statement "Secures immediate delivery at any post office." The release of the revised stamp was delayed by the Post Office until 1888, however, allowing supplies of the first issue to be sold beforehand. But the usage of such stamps had their drawbacks. Special Delivery only served communities whose population was over 4,000 people and could not guarantee delivery by a specific time. To be valid the Special Delivery stamp had to be affixed to the envelope along with all other postage and could not be used to prepay regular and airmail postage.

Five distinct issues showing the running messenger were made. Beginning in 1902 and continuing for 20 years, Special Delivery messengers were issued bicycles to deliver the mail and correspondingly a stamp was issued that year which depicted a messenger riding a bicycle and delivering the mail.

In 1908 a helmet of the god Mercury was briefly used for the design, with the stamp often called the Merry Widow issue after a popular opera in which the lead singer wore a large hat. The bicycle design was reinstated and continued with subsequent issues having differences in perforations and watermarks. The series ended in 1922 when a messenger riding a motorcycle was shown, replaced by a truck in 1925. In the following years the truck and motorcycle pictures reappeared as rates changed and various color, printing and perforation varieties were created.

Finally in 1954 a design featuring hands passing a letter went into use. The last image, instituted in 1969, portrayed arrows. Overall philatelists recognize 23 separate issues of special delivery stamps spanning the years 1885 to 1971. In addition, three Airmail Special Delivery stamps were issued in the 1930s, two regular ones and an imperforated issue specially produced by Postmaster General James Farley. In used condition none of the special delivery stamps are particularly scarce.

In 1977, the Postal Service introduced Express Mail; the two services operated concurrently for the next 20 years. On June 7, 1997, the United States Postal Service terminated Special Delivery mail service which left many unused Special Delivery stamps in circulation that were no longer valid for such postage. The remaining stamps were allowed to be returned to the Post Office for their face value as "services were not rendered".

Special Delivery stamp issues
Issues of 1885, 1888, 1902, 1908
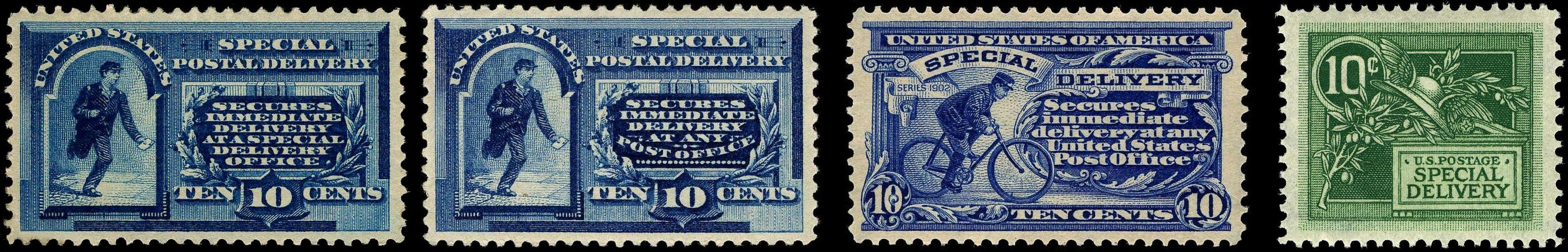
Issues of 1922, 1944, 1925, 1944
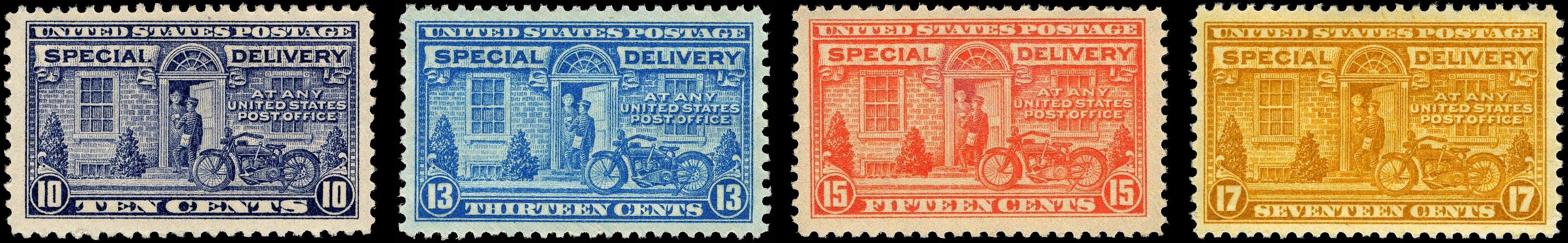
Issue of 1925
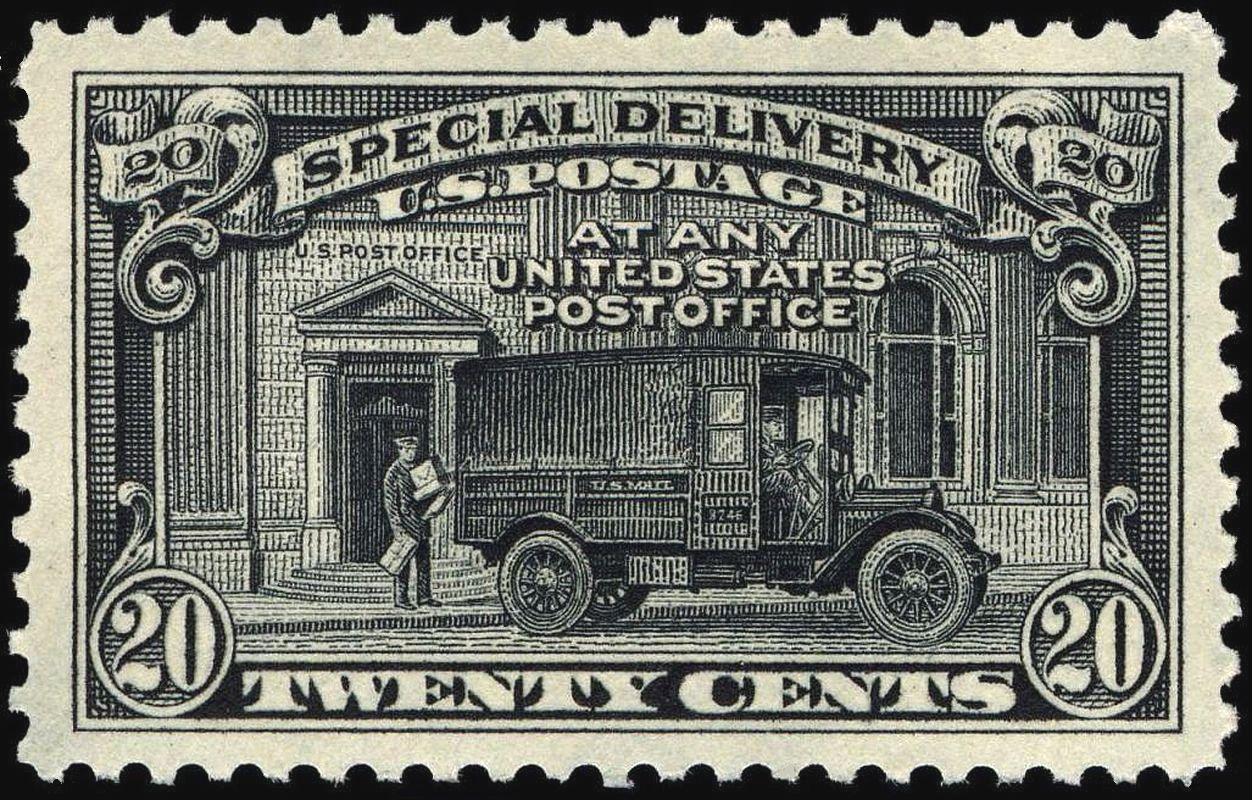
Issues of 1954, 1957 and 1969, 1971
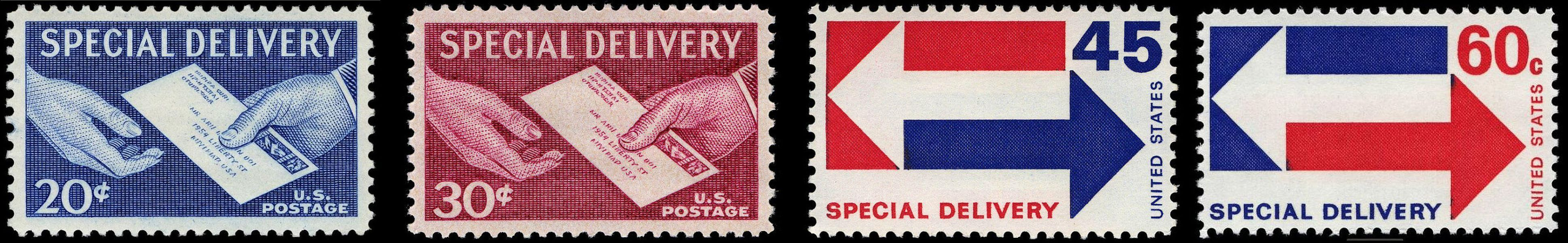
Plate Block section from die proof sheet
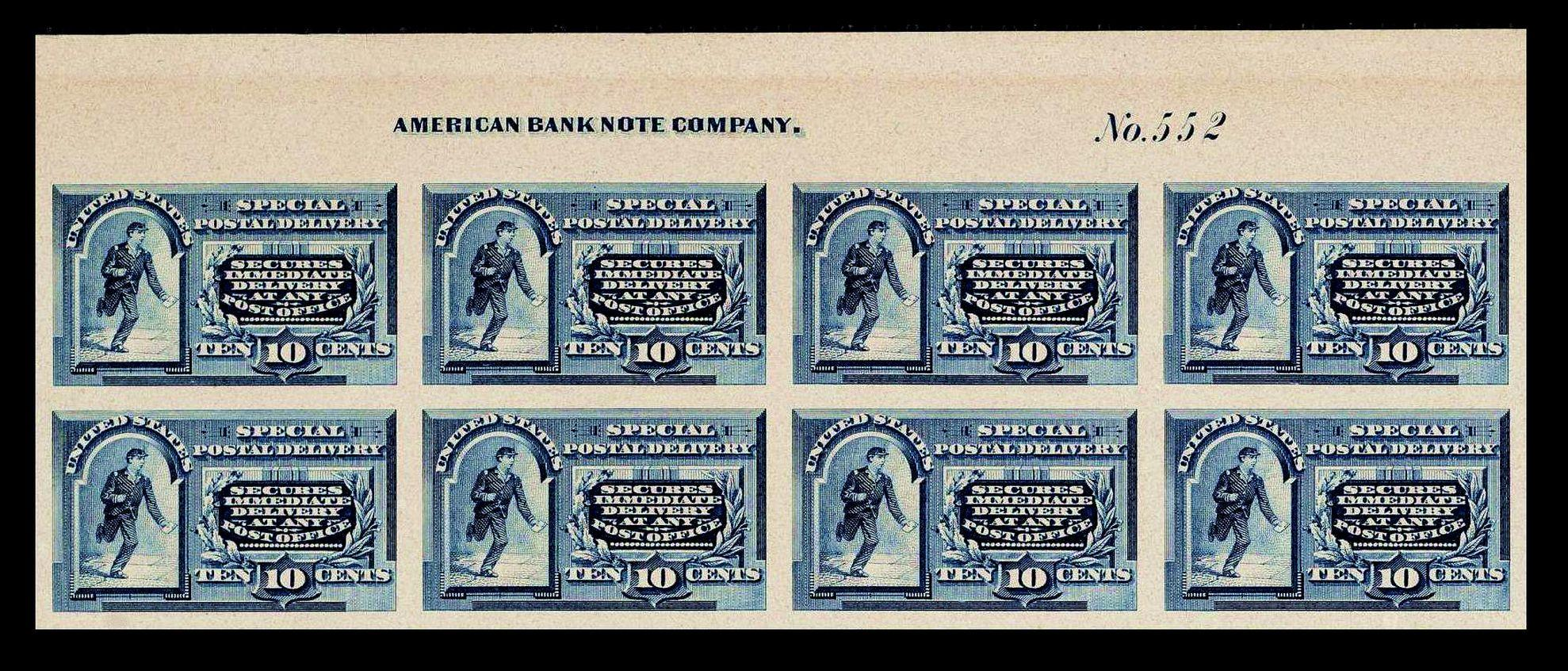

== See also ==
- U.S. Parcel Post stamps of 1912-13
- Parcel stamp
- Postage stamps and postal history of the United States
- Railway stamp
- Stamp collecting
