= Bulletin d'expédition =

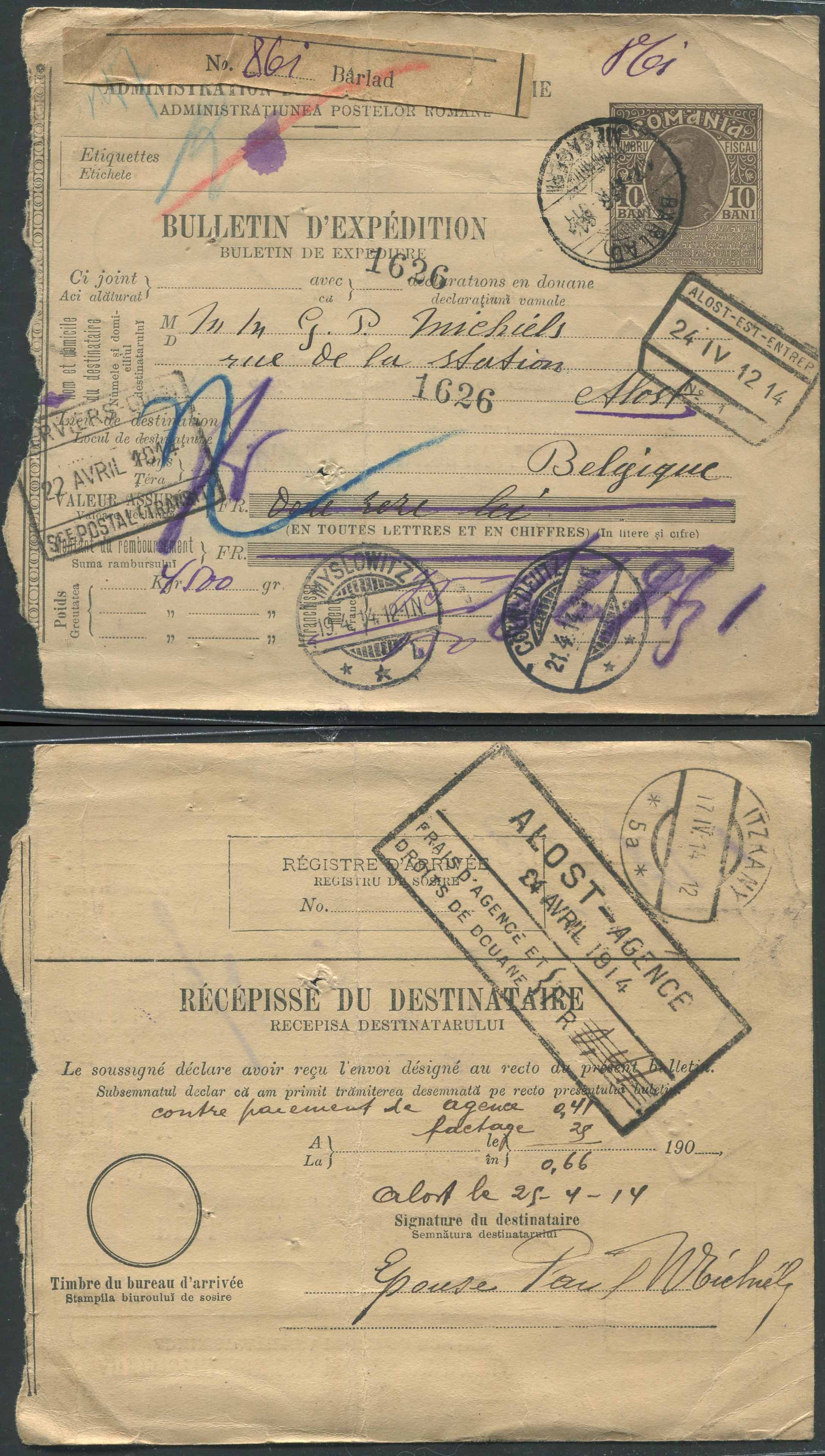
A Bulletin d'expédition from Bârlad, Romania, to Belgium, 1914

A bulletin d'expédition, sometimes known as a parcel card, is a parcel despatch note. Bulletin d'expédition have been widely used across the world. They may travel with the parcel and be delivered at the same time, or they may indicate to the recipient that a parcel is ready to be collected from their local post office. The cards were introduced after the establishment of the international parcel service by the Universal Postal Union on 1 October 1881 (Great Britain, India, The Netherlands and Persia, 1 April 1882), following the Paris agreement of 1880.

The service is covered in the United States Postal Service, International Mail Manual, at section 744, "Foreign Dispatch Notes".

Bulletins d'expédition are to be distinguished from cards left by parcel delivery services, including the post office, where a parcel is unable to be delivered because there is nobody to accept it at the delivery address.

== See also ==
- Parcel post
- Parcel stamp
