= U.S. Parcel Post stamps of 1912–13 =

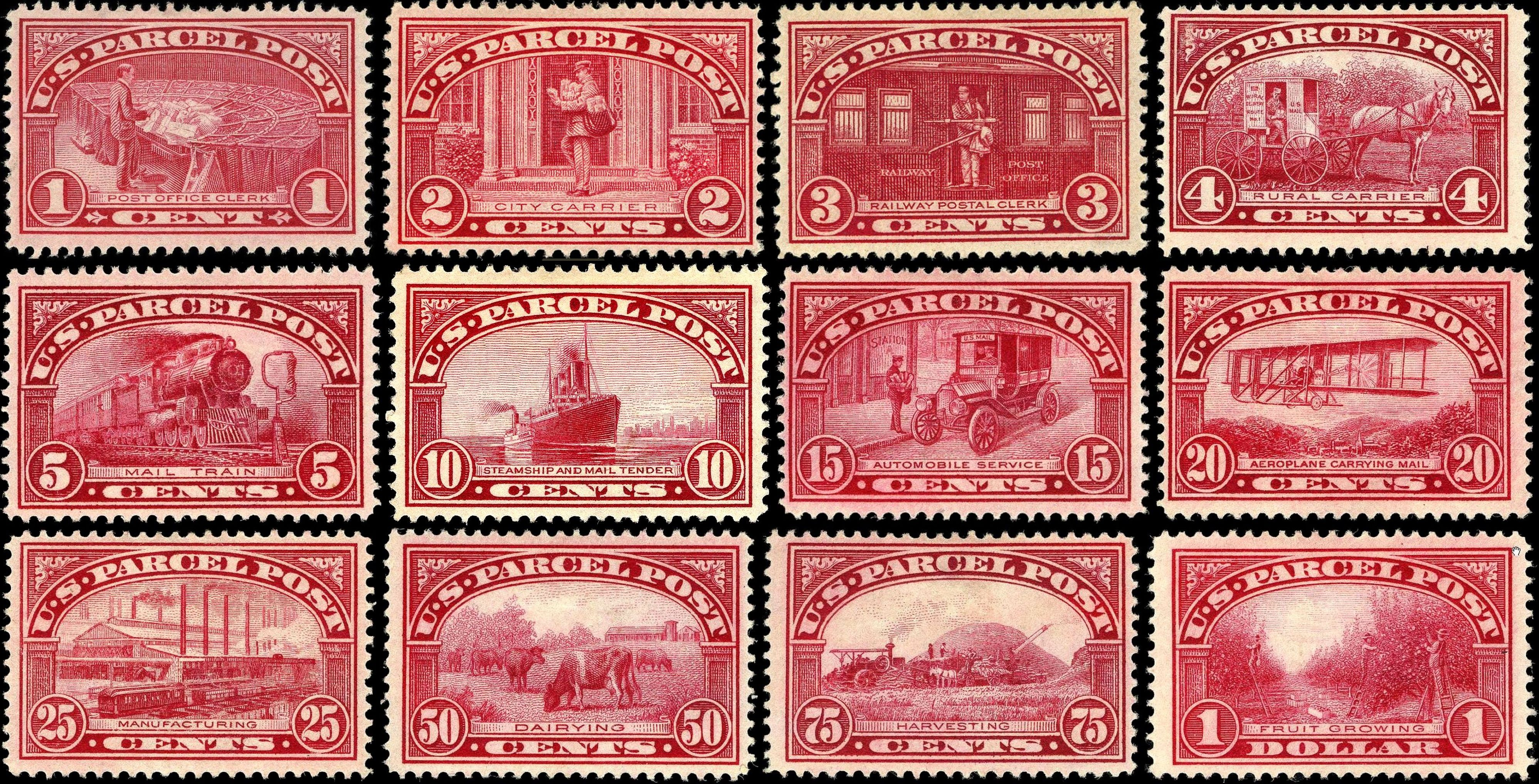
First Parcel Post stamps issued by the U.S. Post Office, 1912–13

The U.S. Parcel Post stamps of 1912–13 were the first such stamps issued by the U.S. Post Office Department and consisted of twelve denominations to pay the postage on parcels weighing 16 ounces and more, with each denomination printed in the same color of "carmine-rose". Their border design was similar while each denomination of stamp bore its own distinctive image in the center (vignette). Unlike regular postage items, whose rates were determined by weight in ounces, Parcel Post rates were determined and measured by increments in pounds. The new stamps were soon widely used by industry, farmers and others who lived in rural areas. Partly owing to some confusion involving their usage, their exclusive use as Parcel Post stamps proved short lived, as regular postage stamps were soon allowed to be used to pay parcel postage rates.

== Conception and production ==
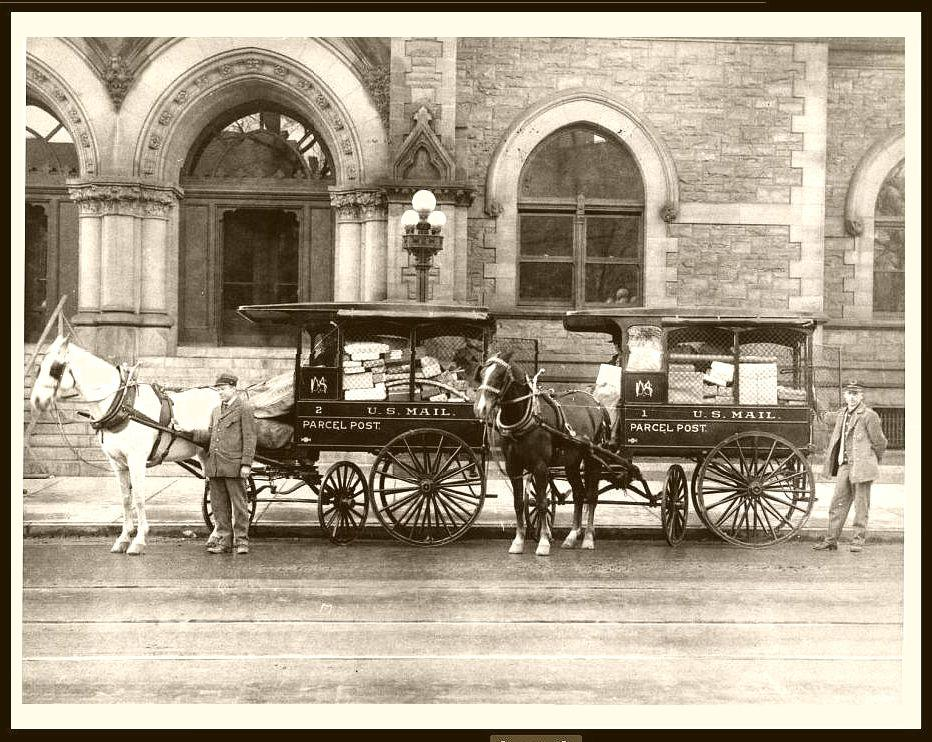
Two horse drawn Parcel Post delivery wagons

Before 1912 the delivery of parcels was controlled and handled by private companies, most of whom operated in cities and urban areas, where most of the business existed. Consequently, delivery of parcels to rural areas was inadequate and frequently hindered farmers who needed various supplies, parts and equipment delivered to their remote locations. To meet this demand Congress approved a law on August 24, 1912, creating postal rates for fourth class mail and providing for parcel post service. The Congressional law authorized the U.S. Post Office to produce the various special purpose postage stamps to pay the parcel fees, which became effective on January 1, 1913, the first day the U.S. Parcel Post began service. The 12 stamps were printed by the Bureau of Engraving and Printing on the flat plate printing press on soft yellowish wove paper made with a single-line watermark bearing the letters 'U S P S' and were perforated with 12 gauge perforations. The stamps were designed by Clair Aubrey Huston who at the time had worked at the Bureau for ten years, while the dies for the individual stamps were produced by several different engravers, with up to four engravers working on each die. The Post Office initially planned to place all dozen stamps on sale before parcel post service began, but Frank Hitchcock, the Postmaster General, deemed the original designs for the 3-cent, 50-cent and 75-cent denominations unsatisfactory, delaying the issue of those values until after the first of the year. The twelve stamps each bore their own distinctive subject in the vignette and were issued in a single color, "carmine-rose". It was Hitchcock who came up with the idea of printing all the denominations of these stamps in one uniform color. However, because of the common color and similarity in border design Parcel Post stamps during the first six months of use were met with mixed reaction from postal personnel who had difficulty distinguishing the stamps at a glance and often confused the denominations, especially during busy hours. "In an effort to help the stamp clerks an inscription of value in large plain capital letters was added to the [sheet] margin, next to each plate number. These were first added to plates on January 27, 1913." An example of these large red spelled-out numbers, which appeared on two margins of each pane, can be seen on the illustration of the ten-cent plate block in the section "Other configurations" further down this page.

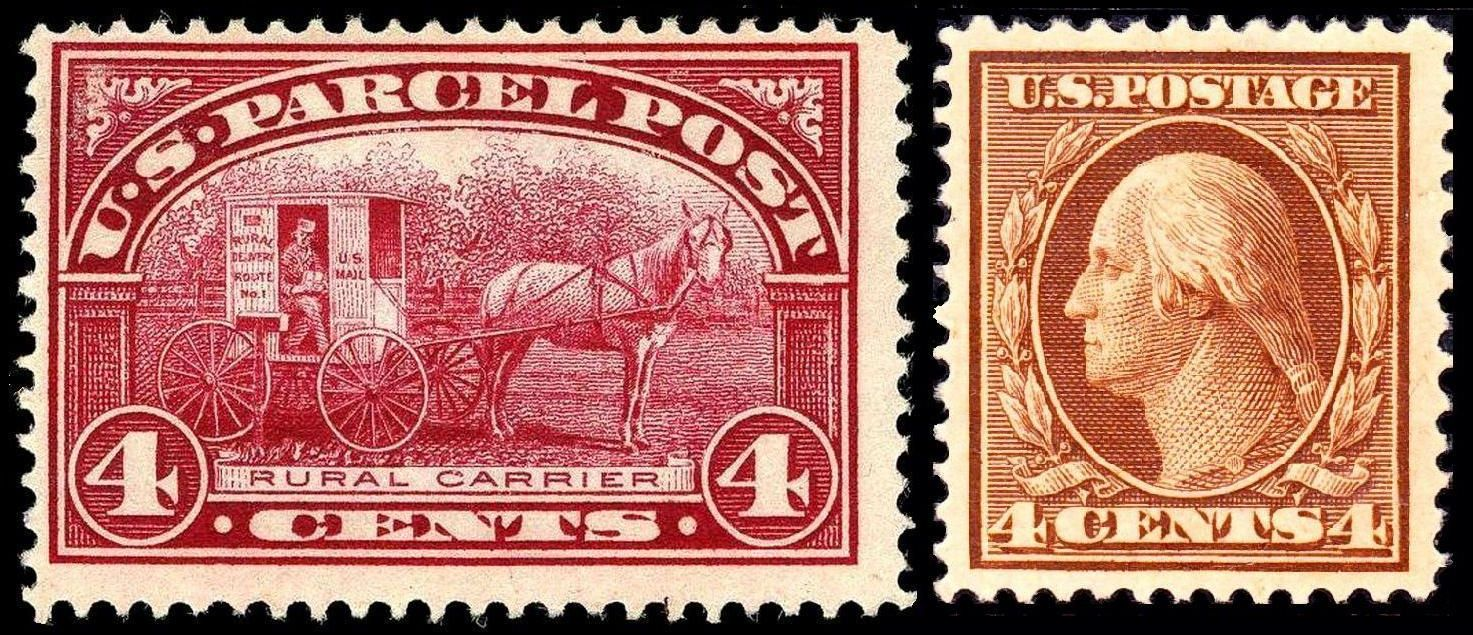
Size comparison of Parcel Post stamp with a regular definitive stamp

To compound the situation the stamps were larger than ordinary definitive stamps of the period, making it difficult to situate them on smaller parcels with limited space around the address and return address. They were also issued in sheets of 180, with four panes of 45 stamps per sheet, which was an inconvenient number for accounting purposes. By March the Postmaster General was considering using different colors for the individual stamps and a smaller, definitive-sized design (for which plates of the 1 cent, 2 cent and 5 cent denominations were even engraved). Production of the Parcel Post sheets cut into 45 stamps each resulted in a somewhat higher percentage of stamps with straight edges (see image below) than other stamp productions, much to the disappointment of collectors at the time. Some philatelic publishers like Stanley Gibbons were rather unforgiving in their estimation of these new issues, referring to them as "very useless stamps" having an "ugliness" about them. European post offices had been offering parcel post service for decades but in America during those years, as Max Johl observes, "the express company interests had successfully fought such legislative action." What finally defeated this opposition was the well-funded lobbying efforts of Sears Roebuck, other prominent mail-order companies and large department stores. The new government operated parcel delivery service was perceived as a threat to the business of private delivery companies, such as the Wells-Fargo Express, who consequently lobbied heavily against the Post Office while it was still in the process of establishing itself in the lucrative parcel delivery business, but they were ultimately unsuccessful.

=== Postage ===
Special stamps were printed for Parcel Post service to help in the effort of keeping accounts and revenues generated from general postage and the Parcel Post separate. The twelve Parcel Post stamps had three basic design themes that were associated with the Post Office and its delivery service. The denominations were such that any amount of postage up to one dollar could be made by using no more than three stamps. Three of the Parcel Post denominations—20 cents, 25 cents and 75 cents—were new to U. S. Postage.

- The first four stamp denominations of 1, 2, 3 and 4 cents had vignettes that featured various postal workers who processed or delivered the mail. The 4-cent stamp featured the Nebraskan mail carrier and Medal of Honor recipient William Haliday Williams.

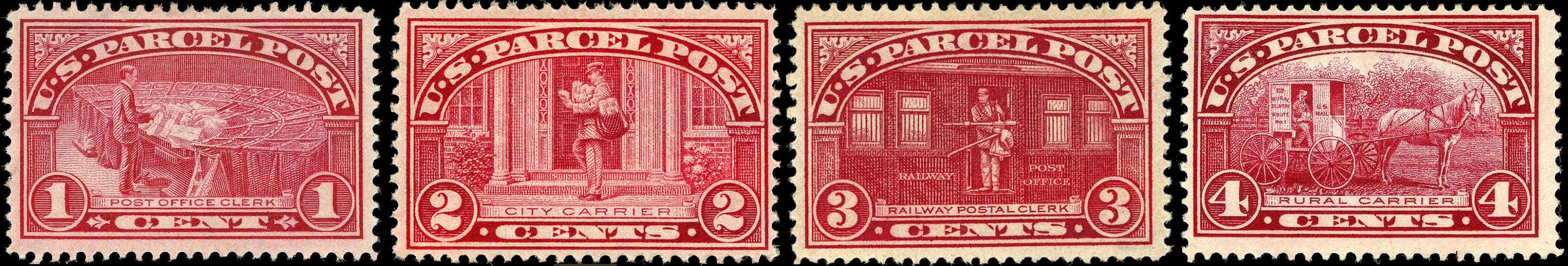

- The second set of four stamps of 5, 10, 15 and 20 cents, depicted the various transportation methods for delivering the mail. The 20-cent U.S. Parcel Post stamp of 1912 had the distinction for being the first postage stamp in history to depict an airplane (identified as an "aeroplane"), six years before the U.S. Post Office Department issued stamps for airmail service. The steamship depicted on the 10-cent stamp is the SS Kronprinz Wilhelm with a mail tender along its starboard side in New York Harbor.

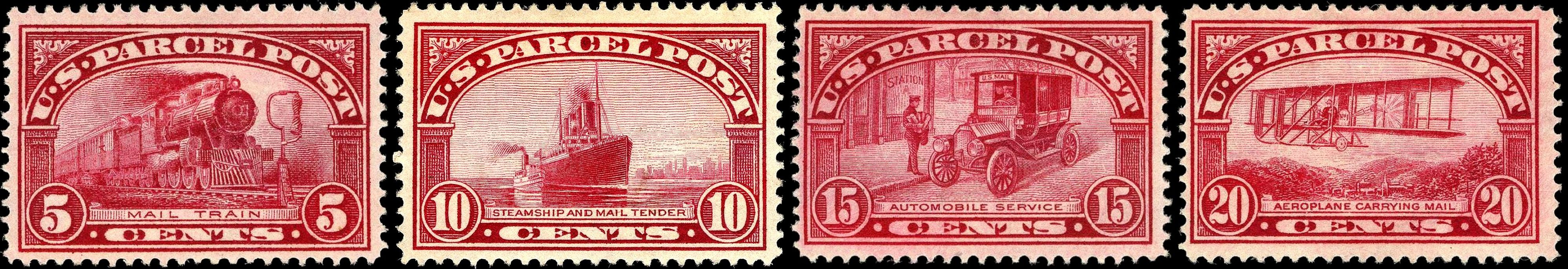

- The last set of four had the highest denominations—25, 50, and 75 cents and 1 dollar—and depicts the various industries which primarily would be using this new service. The 25-cent stamp features an actual steel plant in South Chicago during that period. The three highest denominations, for which demand was limited, were issued in much smaller quantities than the other stamps, particularly the dollar value.

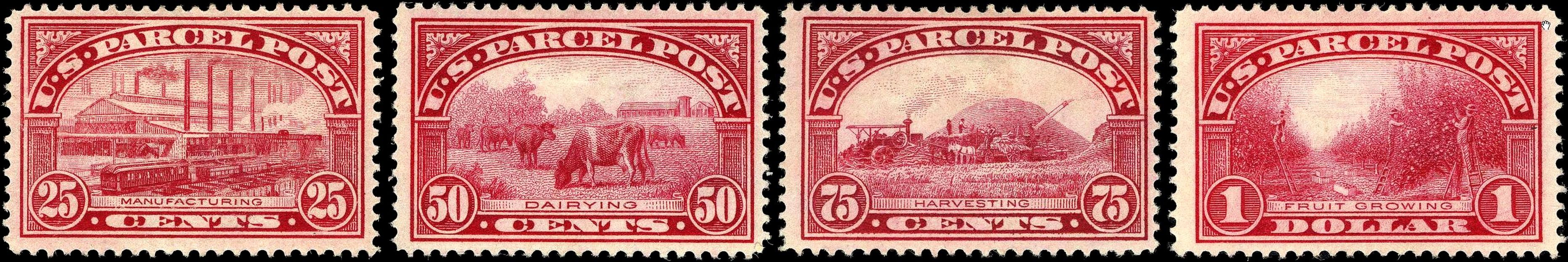

=== Dates of issue and quantities ===
U.S. Parcel Post stamps of 1912–13
Denomination	Vignette	1st day of issue	Quantities issued
1 cent	Post office clerk	Nov. 27, 1912	209,691,094
2 cents	City carrier	Nov. 27, 1912	206,417,253
3 cents	Railway postal clerk	April 5, 1913	29,027,433
4 cents	Rural carrier	Dec. 12, 1912	76,743,813
5 cents	Mail train	Nov. 27, 1912	108,153,993
10 cents	Steamship and mail tender	Dec. 9, 1912	56,896,653
15 cents	Automobile service	Dec. 16, 1912	21,147,033
20 cents	Airplane carrying mail	Dec. 16, 1912	17,142,393
25 cents	Manufacturing	Nov. 27, 1912	21,940,653
50 cents	Dairying in America	March 13, 1913	2,117,793
75 cents	Harvesting	Dec. 18, 1912	2,772,615
1 dollar	Fruit growing	Jan. 3, 1913	1,053,273

=== Postage due ===
In conjunction with Parcel Post stamps, Congress approved an act on August 24, 1912, for postage due stamps which were issued at the same time the Parcel Post stamps were issued, to be used when inadequate postage was affixed to a parcel. Postage-due stamps were affixed by the postmaster and the amount was supposed to be paid by the addressee.

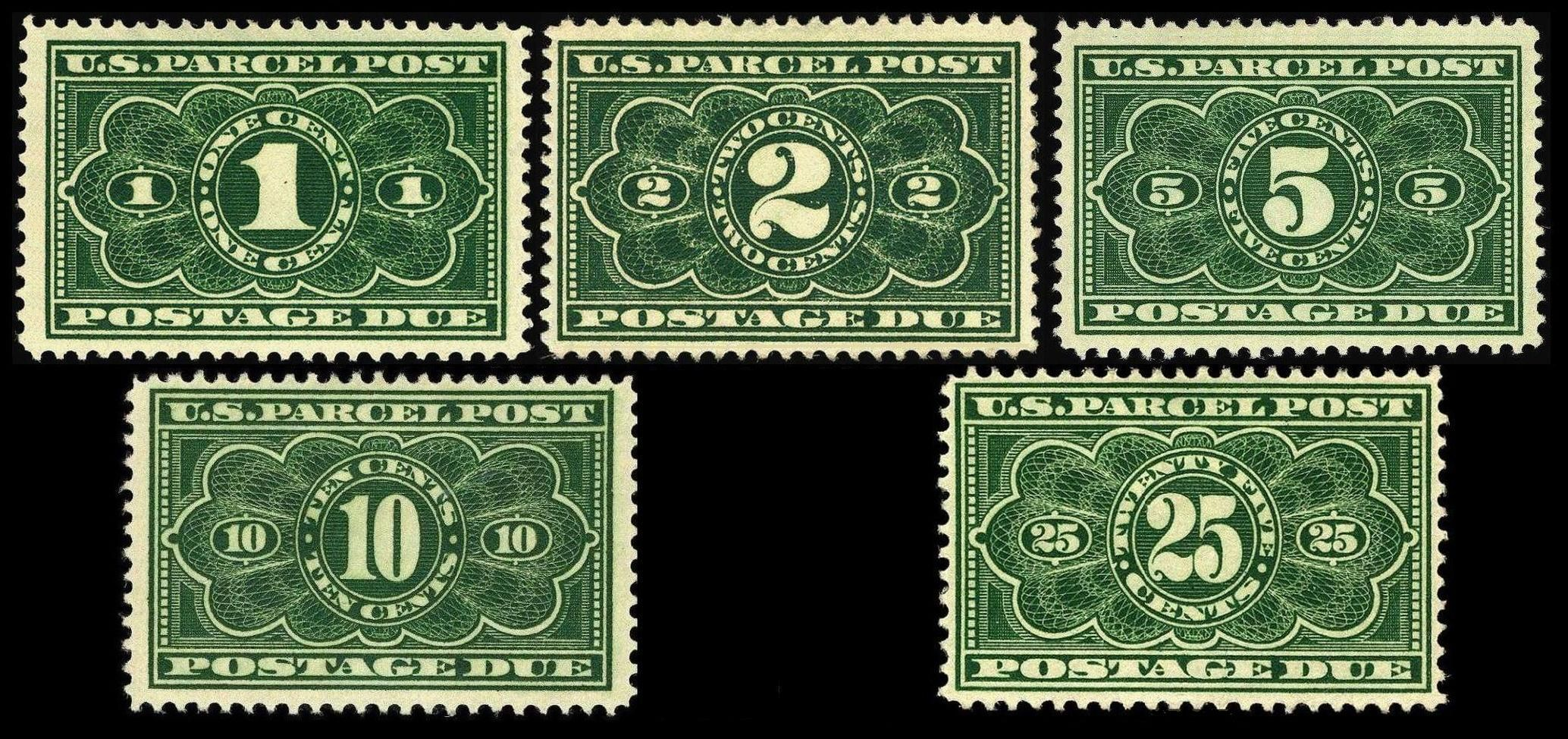
Postage-due stamps of 1912

== Usage ==
During the first half year of its inception, the Parcel Post service with its new series of special stamps proved to be very successful, resulting with the mailing of more than 300 million parcels during this short period. But after much confusion among and pressure from postal workers, the Post Office Department acquiesced and the Postmaster General authorized the use of ordinary postage stamps to pay the postage on 4th class parcels, beginning on July 1, 1913, ending mandatory use of the new stamps after precisely six months. In turn Parcel Post stamps were allowed for use to pay the postage for all classes of mail until the supply finally ran out. This is the only series of stamps issued by the Post Office that have ever been allowed dual usage. The last printing of Parcel Post stamps, a run of the 10-cent value, occurred on June 24, 1913, but stamps still in stock continued to be shipped to post offices for quite some time, particularly of higher values, with the final delivery—a supply of 75-cent stamps—made as late as 1921. Although the stamps were discontinued, one new denomination of the series—20 cents—was deemed too useful to discard, and a 20 cent value was accordingly added to the existing definitive Washington–Franklin series.

With the termination of Parcel Post stamps the need for Parcel Post Postage Due stamps also ended. They had seen little use since most parcels were properly weighed and paid for at post offices. But in a way analogous to the Parcel Post issues they were retained by postmasters and used as regular postage due stamps until the supplies were exhausted. Some were employed well into the 1920s. The 25-cent denomination was of particular use since there was no correspondingly valued regular postage-due stamp.

Aside from items that were considered dangerous to handle, almost any type of merchandise was allowed to be mailed by the Parcel Post service, even baby alligators and honey bees. (Such fragile items were later additionally charged by special handling stamps.) Soon the new service was widely used by farmers and other rural Americans to purchase merchandise they previously could not obtain at their remote locations. This in turn aided the growth of mail order giants such as Sears Roebuck and Montgomery Ward.

== Other configurations ==
The Parcel Post stamps of 1912–13 were printed on the flat plate press which yielded plate blocks of six stamps with the plate number designated in the margin (designating a particular printing run). Beginning in January 1913, the denomination of the stamps was printed in word form in the margin.

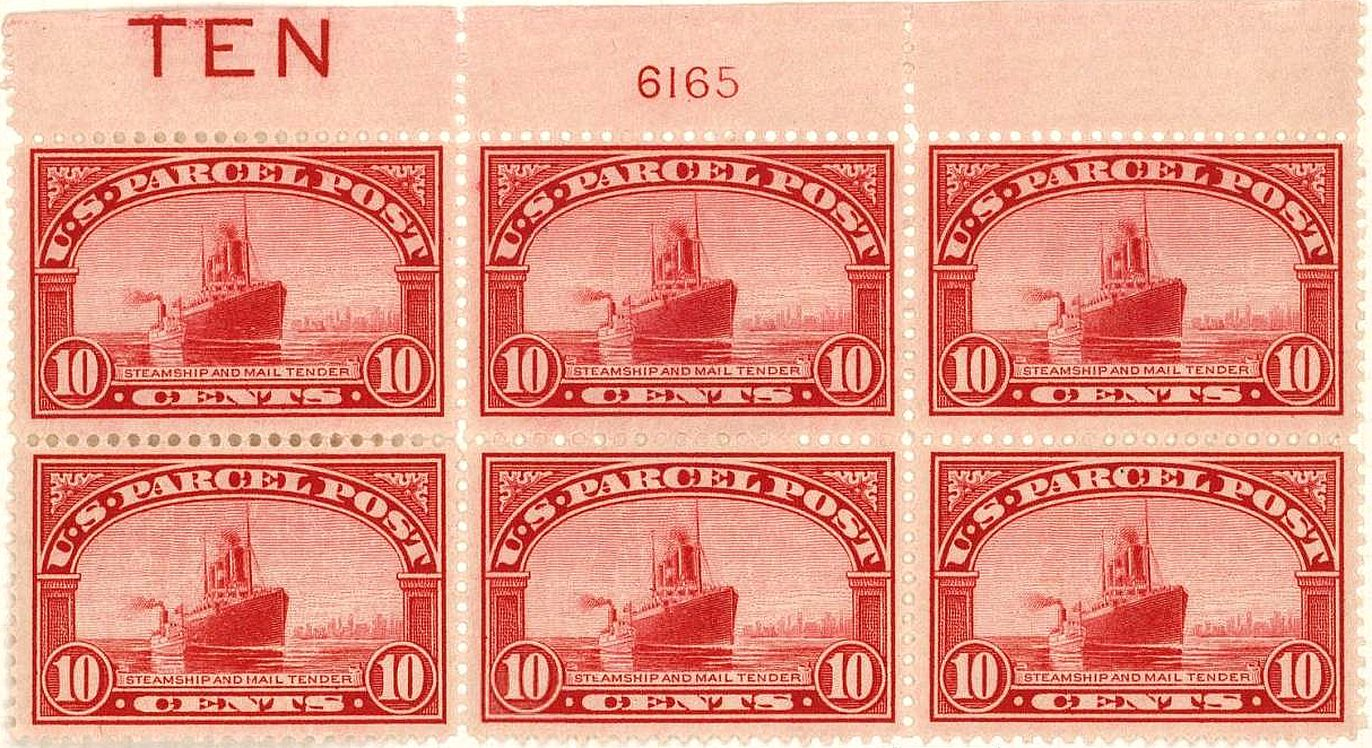
Plate block of six stamps

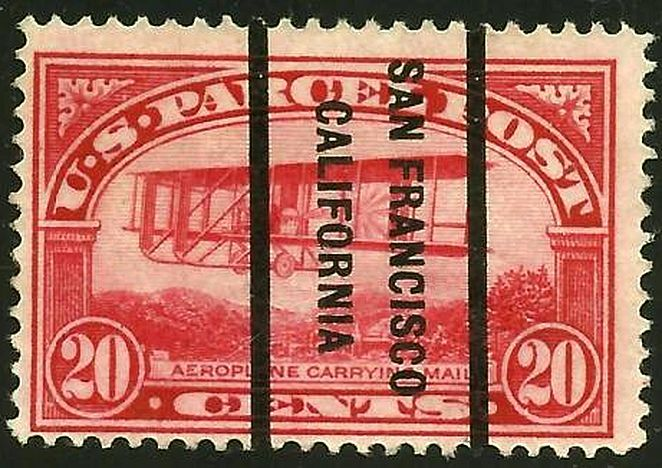
Parcel Post, Precancelled

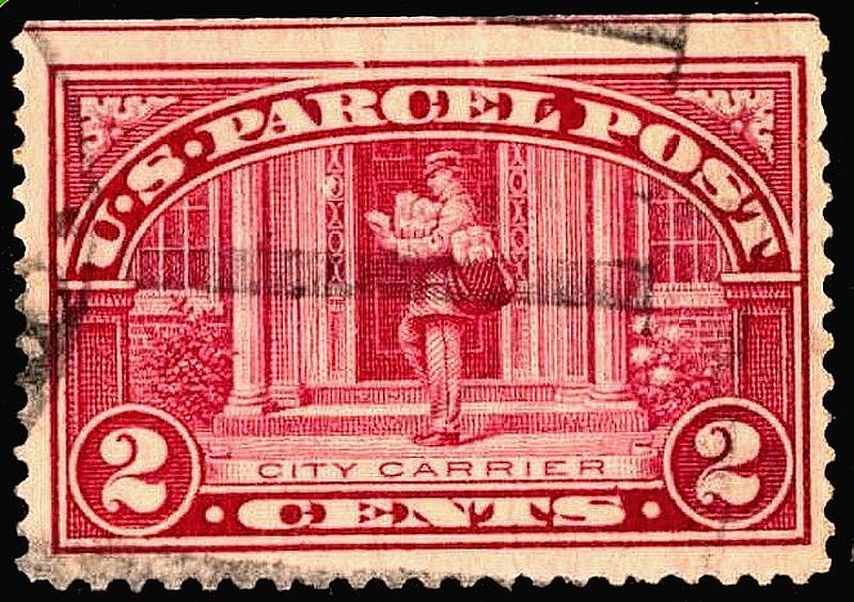
Parcel Post with straight edge

=== Die proofs ===
A special printing of the 1912–13 Parcel Post stamps was made for the Panama–Pacific Exposition held in San Francisco in 1915 from the dies that made the printing plates for this series of stamps. They are referred to as Die Proofs and are printed directly from the die on soft yellowish wove paper one at a time. Subsequently, die proofs have no perforations around them.

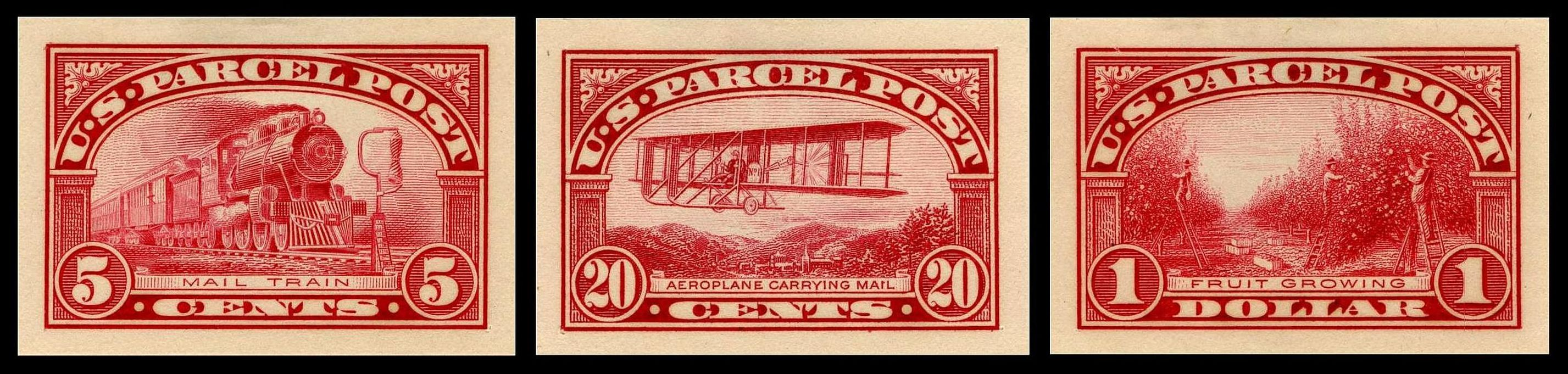
Selected Parcel Post die proofs

== See also ==
- Parcel stamp
- Postage stamps and postal history of the United States
- U.S. Special Delivery (postal service)
- Stamp collecting

== Bibliography ==
- "5c Mail Train Parcel Post Panama-Pacific small die proof". Smithsonian National Postal Museum.
- "10-cent Steamship". Smithsonian National Postal Museum.
- "20-cent Airplane". Smithsonian National Postal Museum.
- "The Parcel Post Issues of 1912". 1847 us.com. Archived from the original on January 8, 2017.
- "The Parcel Post Issues of 1912: Parcel Post Stamps Designs". 1847 us.com.
- Baadke, Michael (December 14, 1998). "Postage stamps designated for parcel delivery". Linn's Stamp News; Amos Press, Inc.
- "U.S. #Q1 1912 1¢ Post Office Clerk, Parcel Post". Mystic Stamp Company. 2014. Archived from the original on May 19, 2014.
- Hatcher, James B.; Cummings, William W., eds. (1981). SCOTT Specialized Catalogue of United States Stamps, 1982. New York: Scott Publishing Company.
- King, Beverly; Johl, Max (1935). The United States Postage Stamps of the Twentieth Century, Volume III. H. L. Lindquist.
- McCutcheon, Paul K., ed. (2014). "Parcel Post: Delivery of Dreams". Smithsonian Institution.
- Power, Eustace B. (1918). The postage stamps of the United States issued during the twentieth century, 1901-1918. Stanley Gibbons Inc., New York, 89 pages.
- The Philatelic Gazette. Vol. 3. J. M. Bartels Company. 1913., E-book
- "Postage Due Issues". Smithsonian National Postal Museum.
- "Parcel Post". USPS. 2014.
