= Parcel post =

Type of mailing

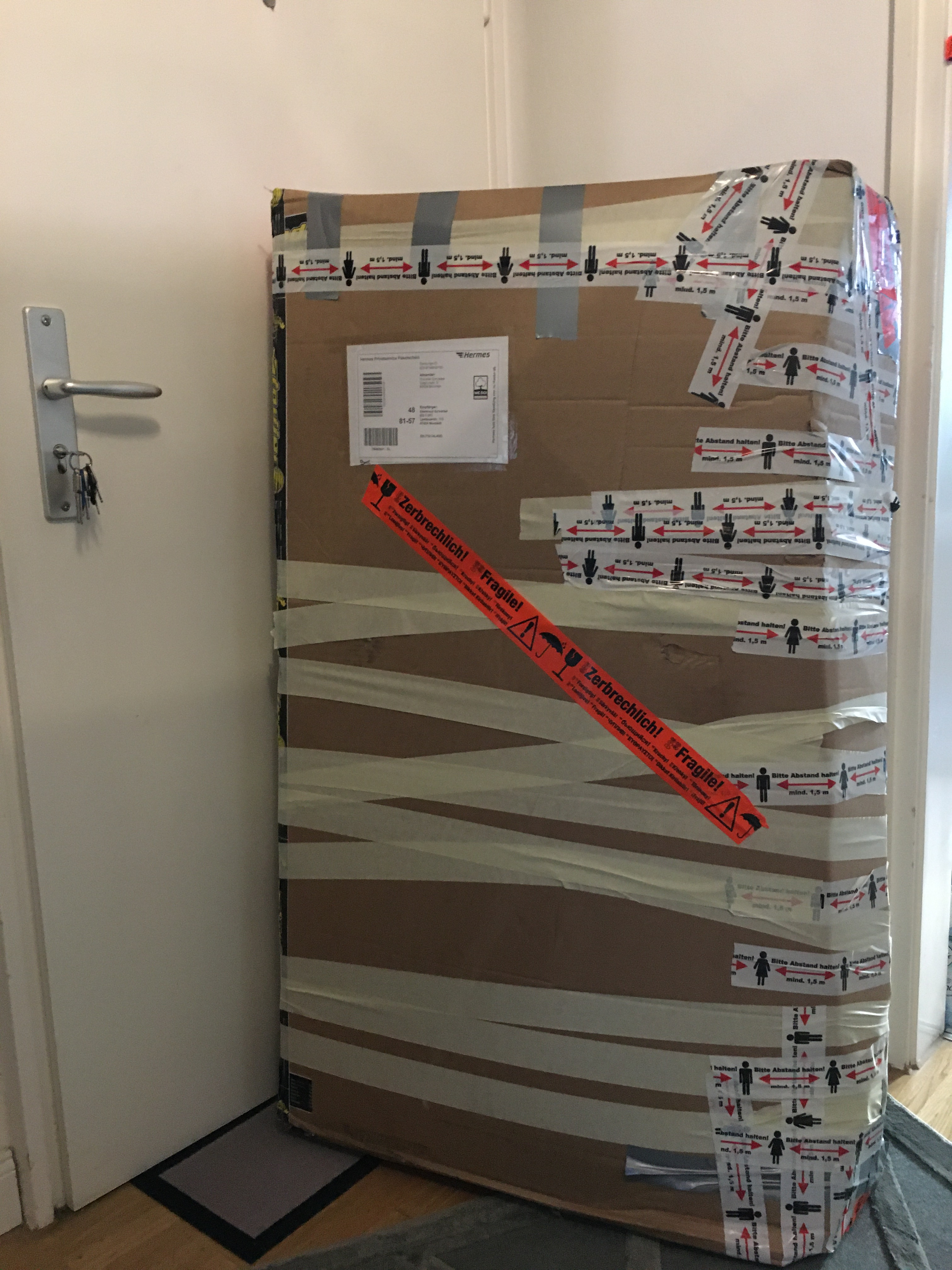
A 46-inch TV set packed in a cardboard package, delivered via a delivery van

Parcel post is a postal service for mail that is too heavy for normal letter post. It is usually slower than letter post. The development of the parcel post is closely connected with the development of the railway network which enabled parcels to be carried in bulk, to a regular schedule, and at economical prices. Today, many parcels also travel by road and international shipments may travel by sea or airmail.

== Development of domestic parcel posts ==
The idea of a parcel post may be credited to Germany, where the growth of railways had brought uniform postal rates throughout Germany and Austria in 1857. The practice of forwarding parcels with the mail, however, had been in use in Austria since the seventeenth century and in some German states is said to date to the fifteenth century. In the first year after the establishment of the domestic parcel post in Germany (1874), 38,862,654 parcels were carried, rising to 62,946,100 by 1881.

== History ==
=== 1881: Universal Postal Union agreement ===
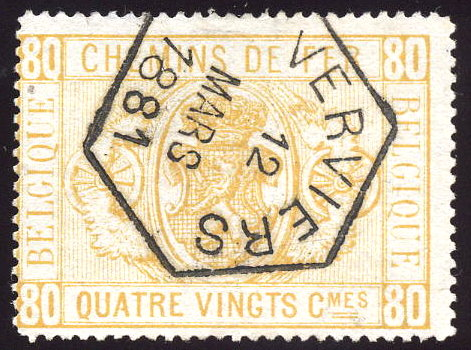
A Belgian railway parcel stamp used in 1881 at Verviers

The international parcel service, which allowed the orderly shipment of mailed packages and parcels from one country to another according to predetermined rates, was established by the Universal Postal Union on 1 October 1881 (Great Britain, India, The Netherlands and Persia, 1 April 1882), following the agreement of 1880 in Paris during a three-week conference on the subject. The service was difficult to introduce as in several countries the carriage of parcels was a monopoly of the railway companies, and Egypt, Great Britain, India, Canada and Italy all initially claimed that there was no parcel service in their country.

=== Great Britain and the Commonwealth ===
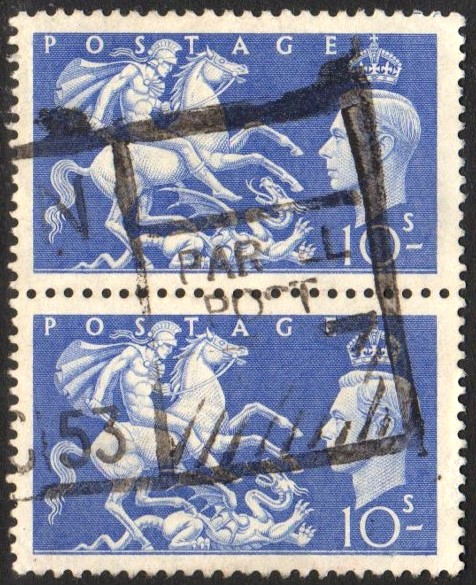
British high value stamps used for parcel post in 1953

The British domestic parcel post service was established on 1 August 1883. Commonwealth and foreign parcel post services were also established. The eight Australasian colonies (South Australia, Western Australia, New South Wales, Queensland, Victoria, Tasmania, New Zealand, British New Guinea and Fiji) and the other separate postal services of the colonies joined the UPU in 1891. By 1909/10, over 118 million parcels annually were being carried in the U.K., around 2.5% of which were international.

=== United States ===
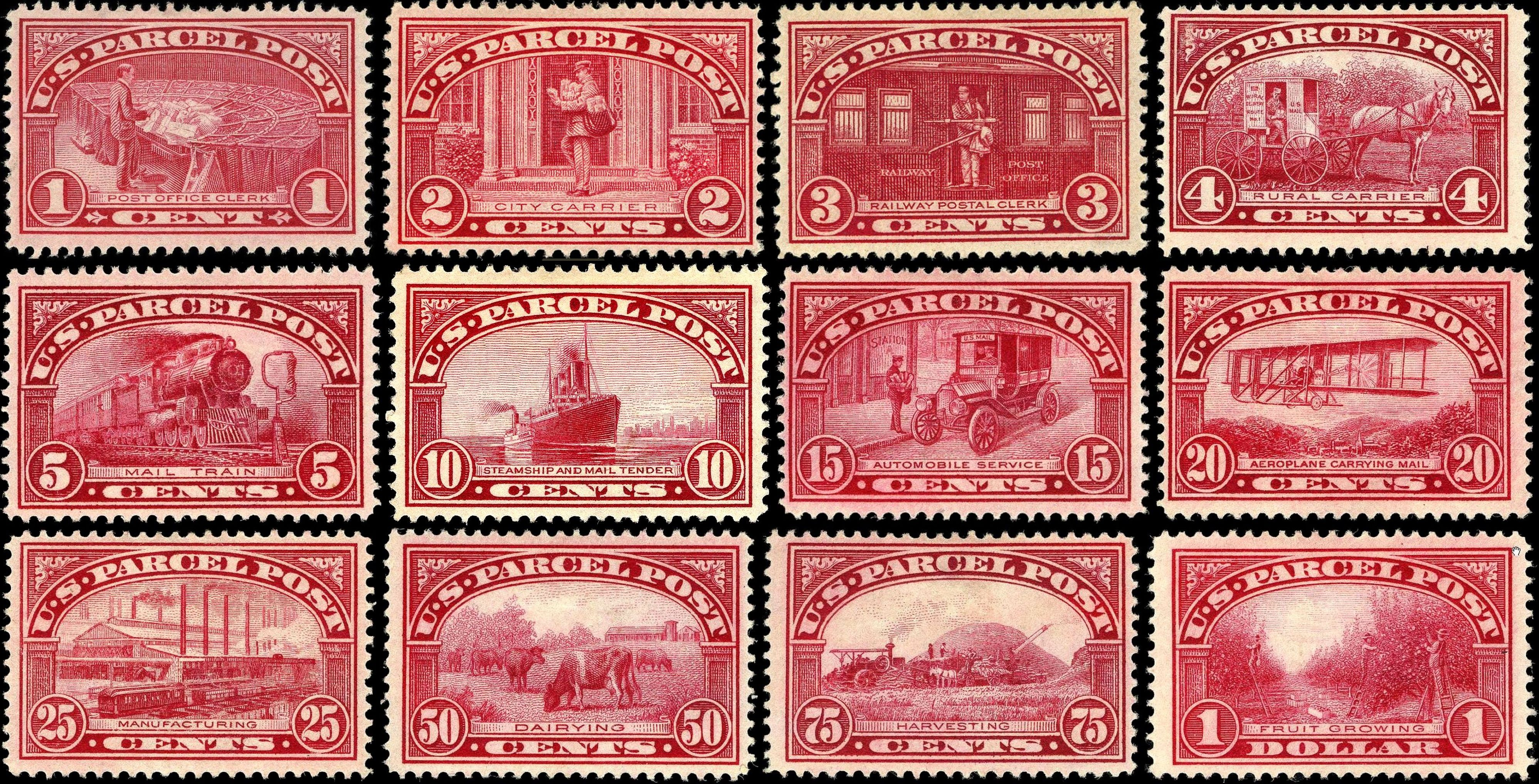
U.S. Parcel Post stamps of 1912–13

The United States, as a signatory, started foreign parcel services in 1887 but did not institute domestic services until 1913.

The USPS, successor to the U.S. Post Office, officially ended International Parcel Post service in May 2007 after some 120 years of existence. International Parcel Post service was replaced by First-class Mail International service for parcels up to four pounds. For heavier parcels and/or printed matter, Priority Mail International, Priority Mail International Flat-Rate, Express Mail International, and Airmail M-Bags, is available to foreign countries allowing these types of mail delivery.

USPS Domestic Parcel Post was an affordable method of sending large parcels of up to seventy pounds and a maximum combined length and girth of one hundred and thirty inches via ground transportation across the U.S. Effective January 27, 2013, the USPS renamed its parcel post service from 'Parcel Post' to 'Standard Post'. Effective January 17, 2016, the USPS renamed the service again, from "Standard Post" to "USPS Retail Ground", a name intended to resemble those of competing services UPS Ground and FedEx Ground. On July 9, 2023, USPS yet again renamed the service to USPS Ground Advantage.

Commercial last-mile Parcel Post delivery service continues to exist under the "Parcel Select" name.

=== Private couriers ===
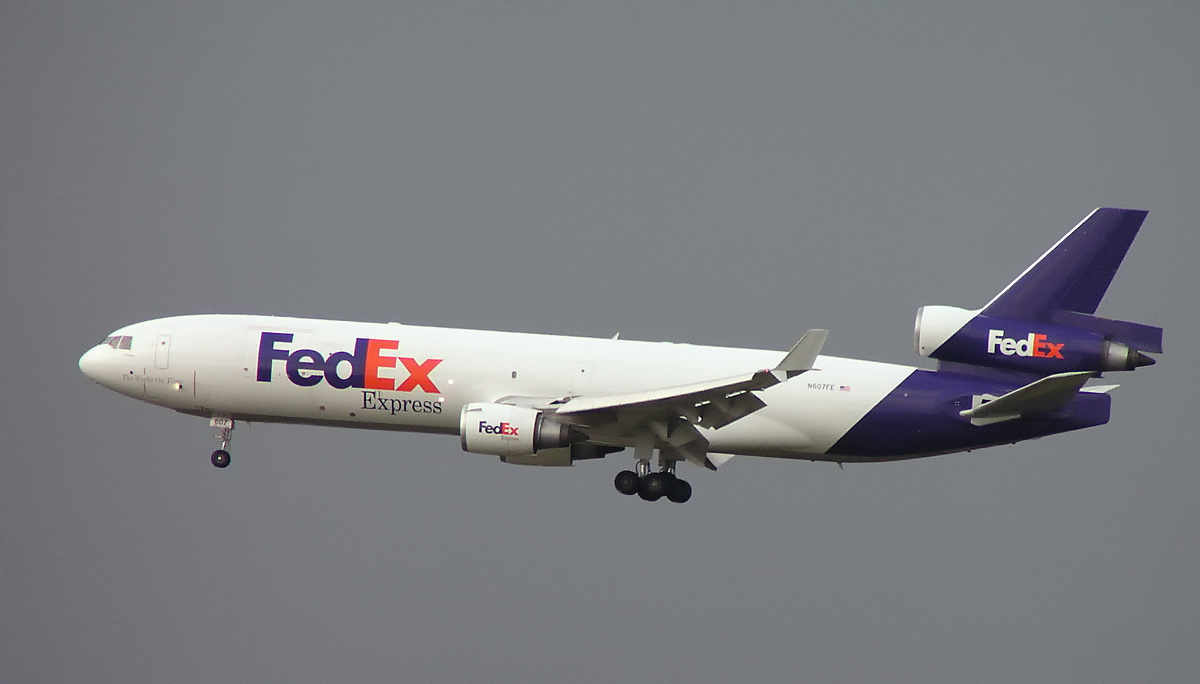
A Federal Express aircraft

Private couriers have existed since goods first needed to be transported from place to place. Before the development of state-run parcel posts, many stagecoach and railway companies had a thriving parcel service and private companies continue to run their own delivery networks today through firms like FedEx Express or DHL Express, even owning their own aircraft for long distance deliveries. Numerous smaller firms provide domestic and international courier services.

== Road transport services ==
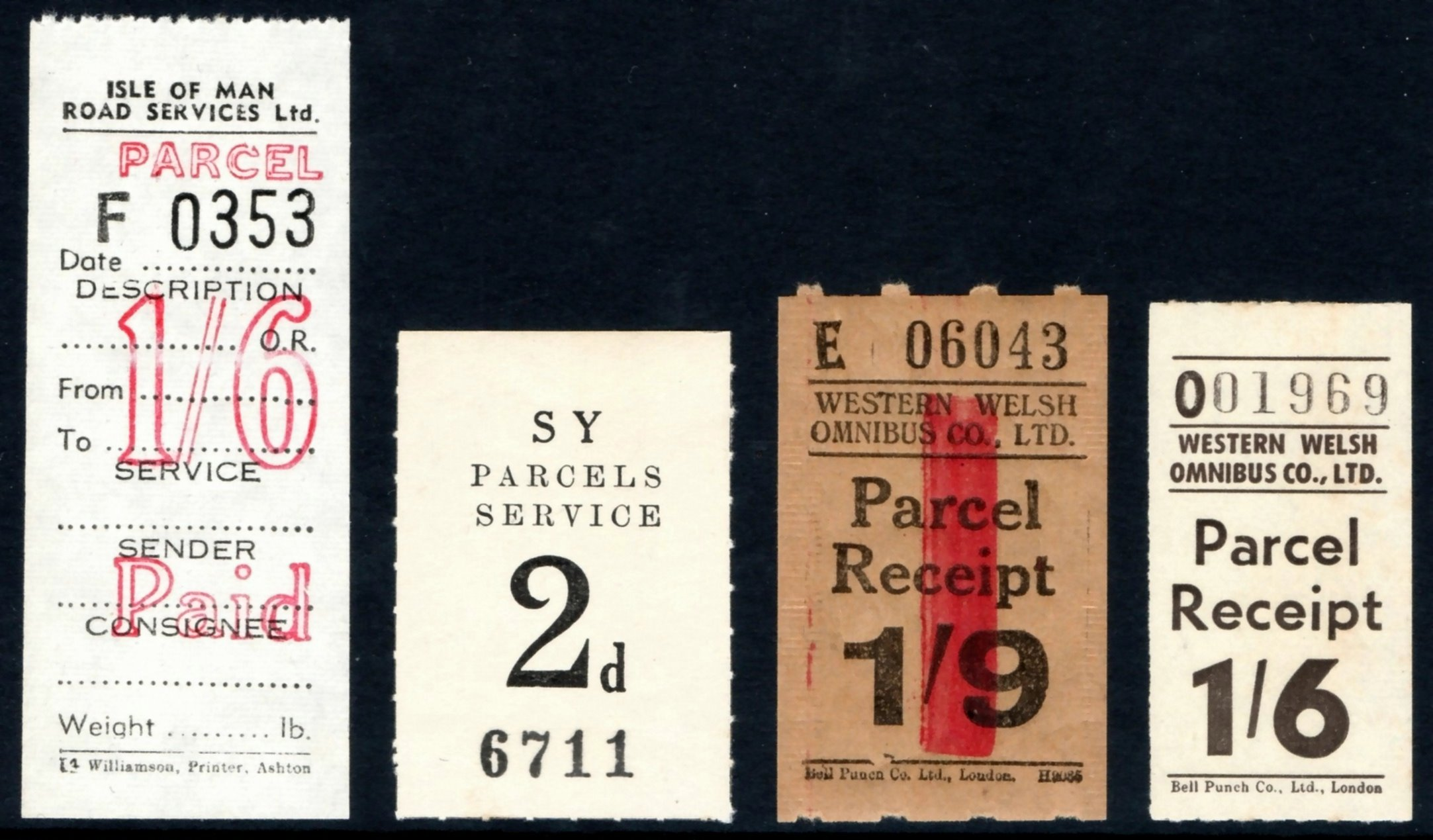
Road transport private parcel service stamps from Great Britain. Circa mid twentieth century.

Before the development of the railway network, road transport was the principal means of parcel transport. Services by road continued to thrive even during the railway age, including by bus, tram and trolley car.

== Size limits ==
The size can range from a standard mail package to a box large enough to protect what is sent, up to a size that can be transported in a wheelbarrow.

== Tracking ==
Parcels often bear a barcode so they can be tracked at all the stages up to their reception by the final recipient.

== See also ==
- Bulletin d'expédition
- Charlotte May Pierstorff
- Package delivery
- Pryce Pryce-Jones
- Surface mail
- U.S. Parcel Post stamps of 1912–13
- Pigeon post
- Drone delivery
