= William Haliday Williams =

- Born: December 13, 1845; Hancock County, Ohio
- Died: September 1, 1916 (aged 70); Colfax County, Nebraska
- Burial place: Schuyler Cemetery, Schuyler, Nebraska
- Military career
- Allegiance: United States of America
- Branch: United States Army; Union Army
- Rank: Private
- Units: Company C, 82nd Ohio Infantry
- Conflicts: Battle of Peachtree Creek
- Awards: Medal of Honor

William Haliday Williams (December 13, 1845 – September 1, 1916) was an American soldier who fought in the American Civil War. Williams received his country's highest award for bravery during combat, the Medal of Honor. Williams's medal was won for his heroism at the Battle of Peachtree Creek in Georgia on July 20, 1864. He was honored with the award on June 19, 1894.

Williams moved to Colfax County in Nebraska after the war and worked as a brick layer, police officer and postal worker. In 1904 he was sent a newer version of the Medal of Honor without explanation. In 1912 Williams was featured as a rural mail carrier on the 4-cent U.S. Parcel Post stamp. He died in Colfax County, Nebraska, in 1916.

== Medal of Honor citation ==
The President of the United States of America, in the name of Congress, takes pleasure in presenting the Medal of Honor to Private William Haliday Williams, United States Army, for extraordinary heroism on 20 July 1864, while serving with Company C, 82d Ohio Infantry, in action at Peach Tree Creek, Georgia. Private Williams voluntarily went beyond the lines to observe the enemy; also aided a wounded comrade.

== See also ==
- List of American Civil War Medal of Honor recipients: T–Z
