= Express mail in the United States =

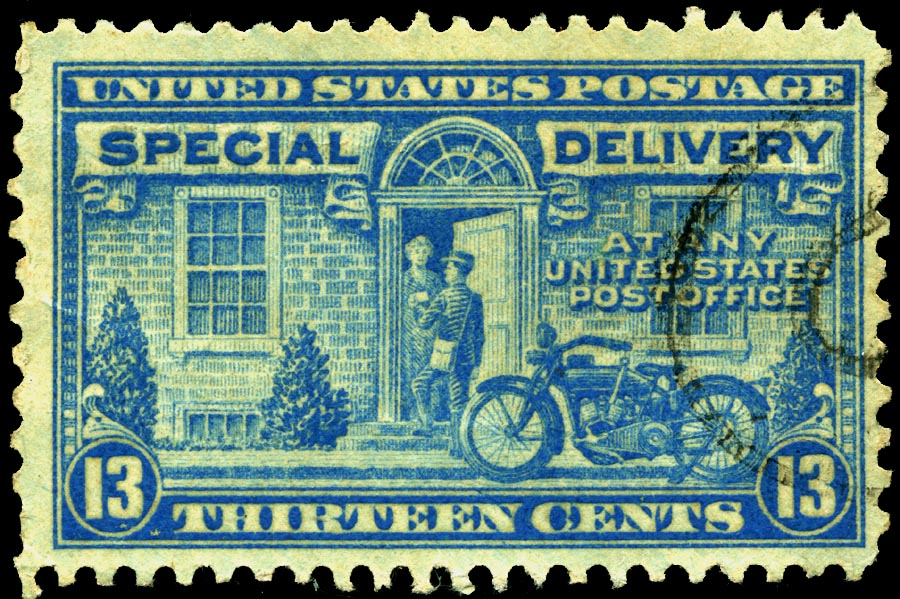
1944 13¢ Special Delivery stamp

The United States Postal Service (USPS) provides Priority Mail Express for domestic U.S. delivery as well as international delivery.

The USPS formerly offered a second international express service separate from the EMS network, Global Express Guaranteed (GXG), which involved USPS offices acting as drop locations for international packages, which would then be handled by the FedEx international delivery network.

In some countries, import rules for packages received by courier services have different tax brackets and duties than parcels received on the postal system, and thus while both were in operation EMS service (Priority Mail Express International), handled by international postal services outside the U.S., may have been preferred over Global Express Guaranteed, which USPS handed over to FedEx for international delivery via courier.

The term Priority Mail Express International is distinct from the domestic service called Priority Mail Express, which is a specific classification of mail for domestic accelerated postal delivery within the U.S.

In 2013, the USPS changed the name of the service from "Express Mail International" to "Priority Mail Express International".

== History ==
Special Delivery, a domestic accelerated local delivery service, was introduced on 3 March 1885 initially with a fee of 10¢ paid by a Special Delivery stamp. It was transformed into Express Mail, introduced in 1977 by Ronald B. Lee after an experimental period that started in 1970, although Special Delivery was not terminated until June 8, 1997.

== USPS Priority Mail Express ==
Priority Mail Express is an expedited domestic mail delivery service operated by the United States Postal Service. It provides guaranteed 1-3 day date-specific delivery to locations within the contiguous United States. Delivery to Alaska, Hawaii, Puerto Rico, and US Territories is provided with a money-back guarantee in the event of loss only. Delivery is also provided to many APO/FPO/DPO addresses at varying speeds of delivery. Priority Mail Express includes end-to-end tracking, $100 of free insurance coverage with the option to purchase additional coverage up to $5,000. Signature confirmation can be added at no additional cost, the only service in which an additional charge is not added. Several types of free, branded packaging is offered for use by the US Postal Service when shipping Priority Mail Express. As of June 2025, Priority Mail Express is the only domestic US mail service in which cremated remains are permitted to be sent, for which USPS offers a special shipping kit.

Sunday and holiday delivery is available in some major markets for an additional fee. The Priority Mail Express date-specific delivery guarantee is suspended from December 22nd-25th of every year.

== USPS GXG ==
Global Express Guaranteed (GXG) service was an international expedited delivery service provided through an alliance with FedEx Corporation. It provided guaranteed, date-definite service from Post Office facilities in the United States to a large number of international destinations. Global Express Guaranteed delivery service was guaranteed to meet the specified service standards or the postage paid may be refunded. For almost all network destinations, liability insurance was provided for lost or damaged shipments.

Effective September 29, 2024, Global Express Guaranteed (GXG) service was suspended to all destinations.
