= Parcel stamp =

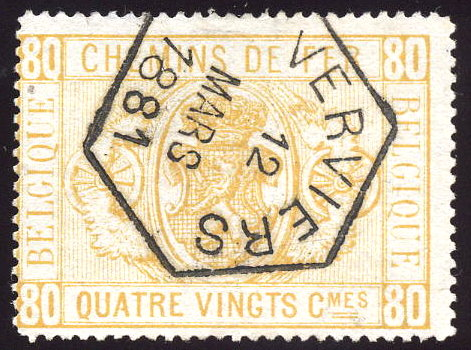
A Belgian railway parcel stamp from the 1879-82 series used in 1881 at Verviers.

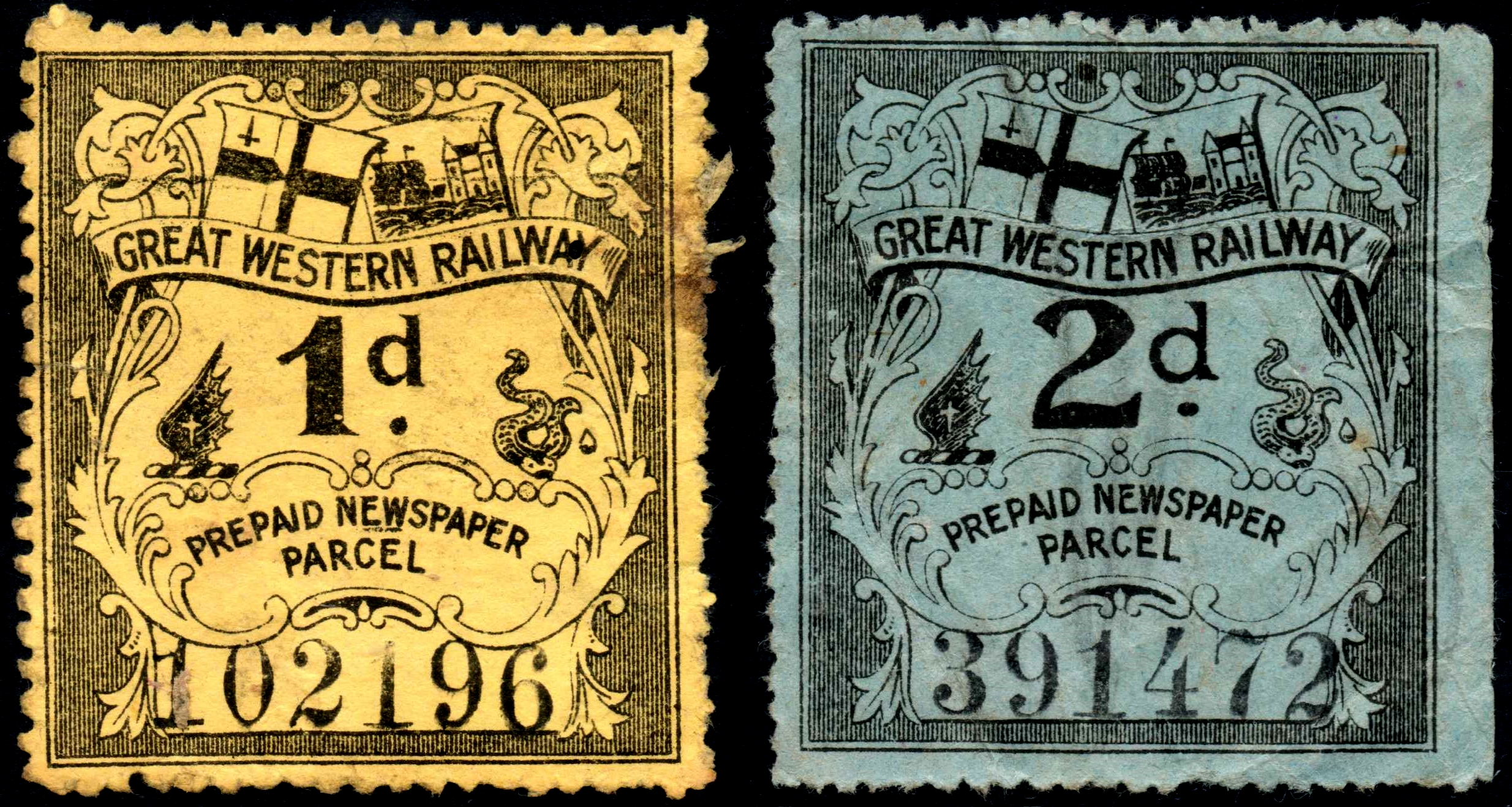
British Great Western Railway newspaper parcel stamps. These are regarded as cinderella stamps.

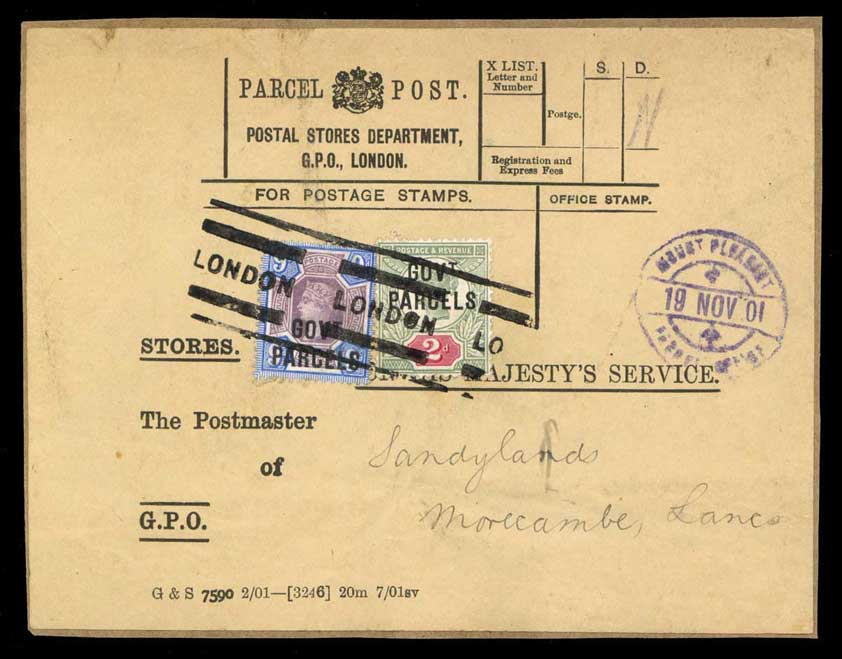
A British 1901 parcel label with two Victorian stamps overprinted Govt. Parcels.

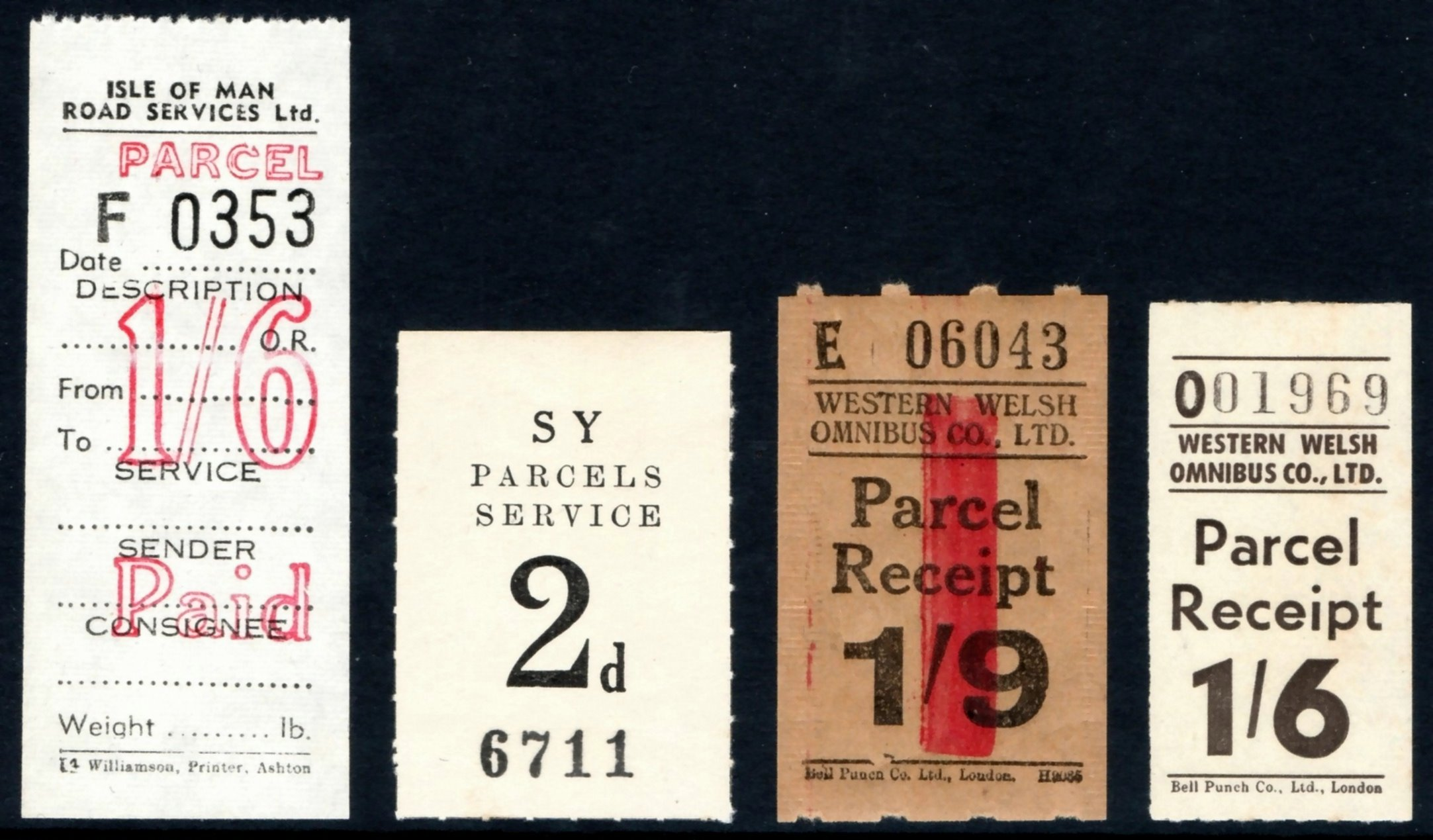
Road transport private parcel service stamps from Great Britain. Circa mid twentieth century.

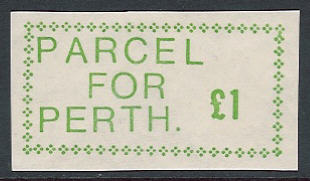
A British 1971 private parcel stamp from the 1971 Postal Strike.

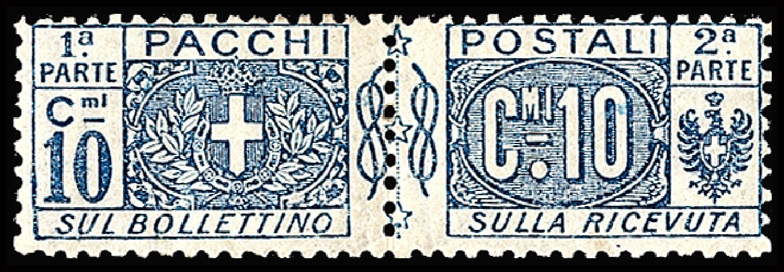
An Italian 10c parcel stamp in two pieces marked pacchi postali.

In philately a parcel stamp is a stamp specifically issued to pay the fee for the transport of a parcel through the postal system and usually marked as such. It is to be distinguished from a postage stamp used to pay the cost of posting a parcel, although there may no practical distinction as far as the sender is concerned. Parcel stamps issued by governments have the same status in philately as postage stamps, but parcel stamps issued by private railway companies or road carriers are regarded as cinderella stamps and many parcel stamps are also railway stamps.

The international parcel post service was established by the Universal Postal Union on 1 October 1881 (Great Britain, India, The Netherlands and Persia, 1 April 1882), following the agreement of 1880 in Paris.

== Belgium ==
Belgium has a long history of railway parcel stamps with the first being issued for the Belgian State Railways in 1879. Numerous different series have been issued since then.

== Britain ==
Britain has not issued any stamps inscribed specifically for parcels, but several stamps have been overprinted with the words Govt. Parcels (Government Parcels). The overprints have been widely forged.

A wide variety of parcel stamps have been issued in Britain by private road operators including bus and tram companies.

== Italy ==
The first Italian parcel stamps were issued in 1884 and since 1914 they have been in two parts marked pacchi postali. The right-hand part was retained by the sender as a receipt and the left-hand part applied to the parcel. By 1909/10, over 14 million parcels were being sent annually in Italy.

== The United States ==
The first and last U.S. parcel stamps were issued in 1912, along with parcel postage due stamps. In this series, which was soon discontinued, the 20-cent value is noteworthy for being the first postage stamp in the world to depict an airplane.

== See also ==
- U.S. Parcel Post stamps of 1912-13
- Parcel post
- Railway stamp
- Bulletin d'expédition
