= Raoul de Thuin =

Belgian-Mexican stamp forger and dealer (1890–1975)

Raoul Charles de Thuin
- Born: 1890
- Died: 23 April 1975 (aged 84–85); Guayaquil, Ecuador
- Other name: 'George'
- Citizenship: Mexican
- Occupations: Stamp forger and dealer

Raoul Charles de Thuin (1890–1975) was a prolific stamp forger and dealer who was originally a citizen of Belgium but who operated from Mérida, Yucatán, Mexico, of which country he eventually became a naturalised citizen. De Thuin's work was considered so dangerous to philately that his tools and stock were purchased by the American Philatelic Society in 1966 in order to curtail his activities.

== Origins and travels ==
De Thuin stated that he was engaged in philatelic "work" as early as 1916 and the philatelic world began to be aware of him between the two World Wars.

In 1927 he had a shop Maison de Thuin, at 35 Boulevard Lambermont in Brussels, Belgium. Services included the removal of fiscal cancellations from British stamps and the application of forged overprints to Siamese stamps.

In a 1969 letter to Carl Walske, de Thuin stated that he was a good friend of Angelo Panelli, who was closely associated with the forger Erasmo Oneglia. A photograph of de Thuin from 1927 may be found in the work on Oneglia by Robson Lowe and Carl Walske.

According to contemporary Mexican newspaper reports, found by the American Philatelic Society, he first entered Mexico in 1931 as a 'journalist', on the run from French and Belgian police who wanted him for forgery. He was then expelled from Mexico for setting up a forgery ring involving public officials, moved to Tegucigalpa, Honduras, who jailed and then expelled him in 1936. He was living in Belize sometime after 1936 and back to Mexico City by the early 1940s. He then appears to have settled in Mérida, Mexico by 1946. In 1968/9 he moved to Guayaquil, Ecuador his wife's home town - the biggest regret of his life.

== Work as a forger ==
De Thuin specialised in forging overprints of Central and South American countries, especially Mexico, thus turning common stamps into rarities. He also copied illustrations that he had seen in magazines, sometimes repeating the mistakes of the original illustrator where he had no original to refer to. He is thought not to have produced whole stamps apart from the classic issues of Mexico.

Robson Lowe compared de Thuin unfavourably with Jean de Sperati whom Lowe regarded as a superior craftsman. He noted that long before the true identity of de Thuin was known, his work had been identified by British philatelists who had named him George. Lowe reported that de Thuin had been quoted as saying that "I have no conscience at all at having deceived all those foolish people. They are just fanatics who neglect their families for their passion." De Thuin had also been reported as saying that although he had only three wives, he had four hundred mistresses and that they had borne him twenty-five children.

De Thuin's method of sale was to use one of his aliases to send sheets of approvals to collectors, mainly in the United States, which mixed a few genuine common stamps with forgeries of rarer items. Many collectors were duped and in 1962 a London sale of 498 lots of classic Mexico belonging to Prof. Hormer Lizama was cancelled when the sale was revealed to consist mainly of de Thuin fakes.

== Aliases ==
De Thuin operated using various aliases and accomplices, including:

- The Maya Shop
- Raoul Ch. de Thuin
- Gilda Rivero Mendoza
- Gilda Rivero de Thuin
- Gilda Rivero Mendoza de Thuin
- Thelma Salazar
- Blanca Soberanis
- Socorro Duran M.
- Belgian Export Company
- French Philatelic Agency
- Free French Philatelic Agency
- Mérida Philatelic Agency
- R.G. Knapen

Gilda Rivero Mendoza was de Thuin's wife and one complainant in 1947 asserted that R.G. Knapen was de Thuin's real name.

The numerous aliases were to circumvent fraud orders which prevented the US Post Office from forwarding mail addressed to particular persons or firms.

== The end ==
In the 1960s the American Philatelic Society began a campaign to drive de Thuin out of business through their 'Committee of Five' and after prolonged negotiations most of de Thuin's stock and equipment was bought by the APS in December 1966 in order to remove it from the market. The APS subsequently produced a reference guide to his work of over 500 pages, however, there is evidence that de Thuin continued to produce forgeries, or at least to sell them from stock, long after then.

As late as 1974 he was still in business in Guayaquil, Ecuador, though it appears old age and bad eyesight had severely curtailed his activities. In private correspondence of 1974 he stated that he had bought a villa there and was married to an Ecuadorian woman. Although almost blind he was still able to conduct business and to travel, saying that he had recently visited his family in Rio de Janeiro.

He died on 23 April 1975.

== See also ==
- Philatelic fakes and forgeries
- List of stamp forgers
