= Fernand Serrane =

Belgian philatelist

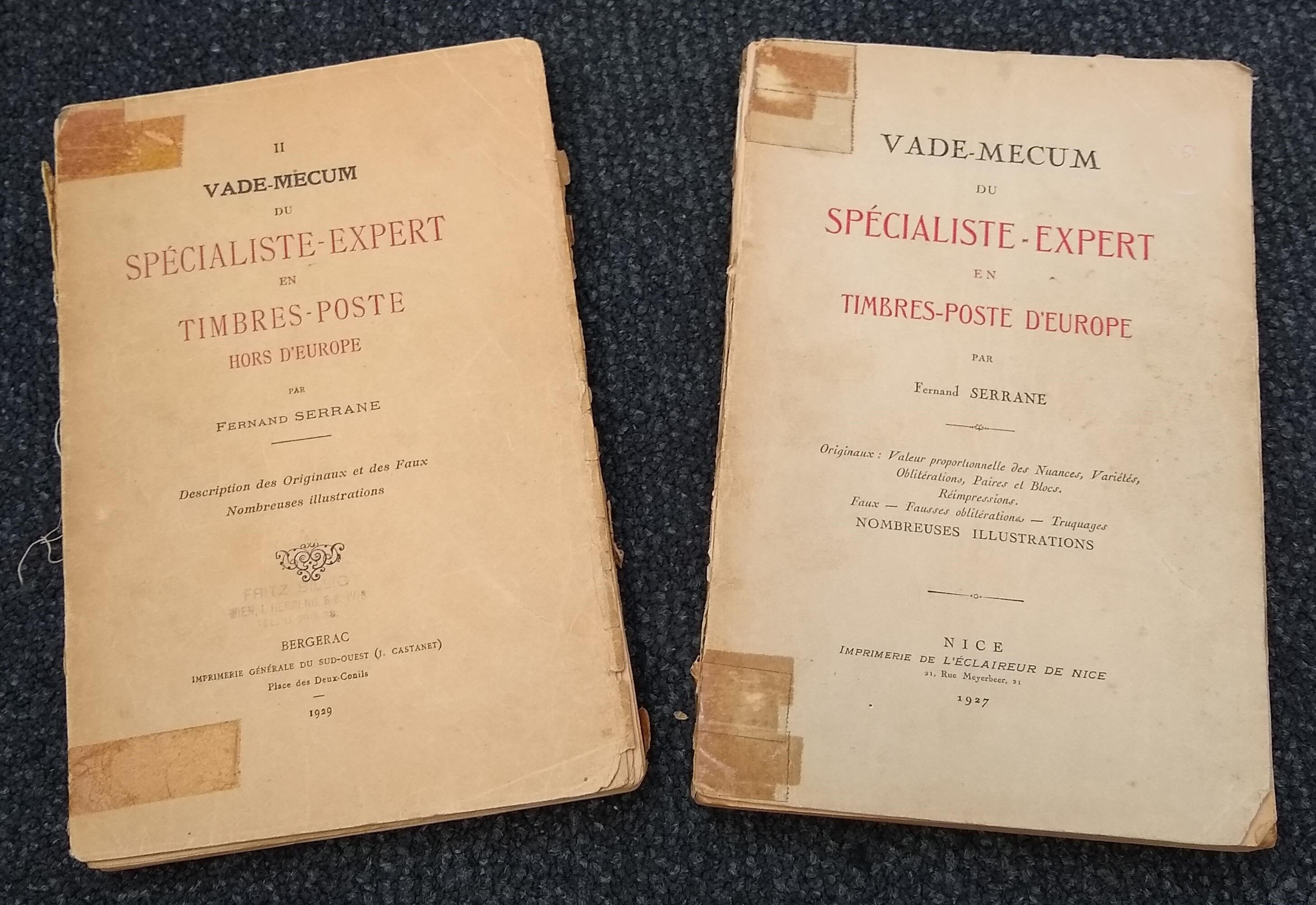
Serrane's Vade-Mecum du specialiste en timbres-poste d'Europe (1927 & 1929)

Fernand Serrane (1880–1932) was a Belgian philatelist who was a popular philatelic author in France and published one of the classic works in the field of identifying forged stamps.

== Masterwork ==
Serrane's masterwork was his Vade-Mecum du specialiste en timbres-poste, published in two volumes in 1927 and 1929.

Not since Robert Brisco Earée produced his last edition of Album Weeds in 1906 had a worldwide survey of forgeries appeared and the two books are essential companions in the study of forgeries and fakes of the classic era.

The later publication of The Serrane Guide, as it is known, is helpful to philatelists as it covers the heyday of some prolific stamp forgers not known to Earee, for instance, Francois Fournier, Angelo Panelli, Lucian Smeets, and N. Imperato.

== New edition ==
In 1971 Dr Cortland Eyer (1906-89), a retired Professor of Romance Languages, began the first English translation of the Serrane Guide. His work was sponsored by members of the American Philatelic Society (APS) and took three years to complete during which time Eyer checked every reference made by Serrane.

The translation was published in serial form in the APS journal The American Philatelist, and in book form in 1998.

Serrane had been a member of the APS since 1925.

== Selected publications ==
- Guide du Specialiste. 1919. (French language)
- Catalogue du specialiste des timbres-poste d'Europe. Brussels: 1922. (French language)
- La reconstruction des planches de l'emission de Bordeaux, 1870. Amiens: 1926. (French language)
- I: Vade-Mecum du specialiste en timbres-poste d'Europe. Nice: L'Eclaireur de Nice Press, 1927. (French language)
- II: Vade-Mecum du specialiste en timbres-poste hors d'Europe. Bergerac: Générale du Sud-ouest (J. Castanet), 1929. (French language)
- The Serrane Guide: Stamp Forgeries of the World to 1926. First English language edition in book form. State College: American Philatelic Society, 1998. ISBN 0-933580-16-9
