= List of stamp forgers =

Soon after their introduction in 1840 postage stamps started to be forged.

The first book about the topic was written in 1862 by Jean-Baptiste Moens from Belgium De la falsifications des timbres-poste. Shortly afterwards Edward Loines Pemberton published Forged Stamps: How to detect them and subsequently Robert Brisco Earée produced his legendary Album Weeds. Today there is an extensive literature on the forgers and their work, and examples from the most accomplished forgers sometimes sell for more than the original stamp.

Notorious and famous stamp forgers include:

- The Spiro Brothers
- Rainer Blüm
- Pêra de Satanás
- Clive Feigenbaum; ex-chairman of Stanley Gibbons
- Sigmund Friedl
- Georges Fouré
- François Fournier
- Madame Joseph
- Louis-Henri Mercier (Henri Goegg)
- Erasmo Oneglia
- Angelo Panelli
- Mendel Shapiro
- Lucian Smeets
- Jean de Sperati
- Raoul de Thuin
- Plácido Ramón de Torres
- Harold Treherne
- Peter Winter

== See also ==
- Philatelic fakes and forgeries
