= Madame Joseph =

British stamp forger (c. 1900 – 1940s)

- Occupation: Stamp dealer

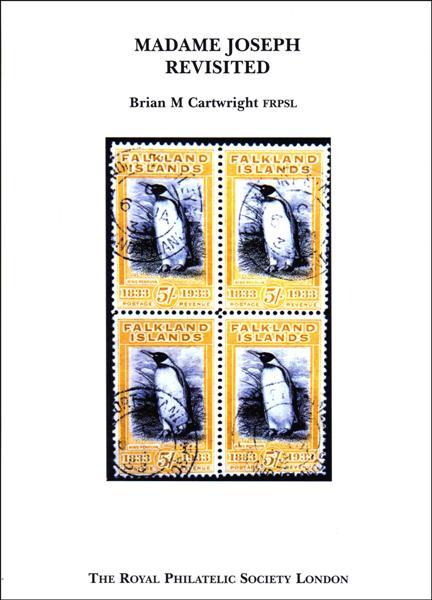
The cover of the second edition of Madame Joseph Revisited by Brian Cartwright showing forged cancels on genuine Falkland Islands stamps of 1933.

Madame Joseph (c.1900 – after late 1940s) was a stamp dealer active in London in the early part of the twentieth century and who has since been revealed to be a major supplier of stamps with forged cancels. In conjunction with her collaborators, more than four hundred fake cancellations were used, dated up to 1949. A 1967 Aden canceller (MJ10) may not be a contemporary fake. Unfortunately, this is missing from the Royal Philatelic Society London archive.

== Forgery business ==
Known as "Madame Joseph" because she went by the surname Joseph and was possibly French or Belgian (her first name is unknown), Joseph, her accomplices and successors used fake handstamps to turn common unused stamps into more valuable used ones. Some fake cachets, cork cancels, surcharges and overprints were also used. More than four hundred fake cancels were used, mainly for British Commonwealth stamps, and it is believed that there are probably additional fake cancels that have yet to be discovered. The wooden cancels were thought to have been made in France, while the zincograph and copper-plated implements may have been created originally for use as book or catalogue illustrations.

"Madame Joseph" may have emanated from the WWII Madame Joseph Krug of Rheims, who ran an underground escape operation for British pilots downed in occupied France. "Madame Joseph" was probably not the name of one person but the nom de guerre used by this group, who operated in utmost secrecy with the aid of SOE.

According to Brian Cartwright, there was also a "Monsieur Joseph"; however, even less is known about him than his wife and, as Madame Joseph was normally responsible for serving customers, the business and fakes have come to be attributed to her. The exact extent of Monsieur Joseph's involvement in the business has yet to be determined and may be more extensive than previously thought.

The trade was very profitable, with the changed stamps being sold to dealers for resale to their customers. It has been said that the fake cancels were also hired out to unscrupulous dealers for them to manufacture their own fine used stamps; however, that has been disputed by the postal historian Ted Proud. According to Proud, Madame Joseph had premises in Irving Street, just off Charing Cross Road.

The exact dates when the business was carried on are unknown; however, the first use of the cancels appears to be between the first and second World Wars, and the most recent date on any fake cancel is 1949. Three sheets of paper containing 120 different impressions have been found in the Stanley Gibbons reference collection and they appear to have previously been folded, so as to possibly make a booklet of samples. The latest date of any of these cancels is 28 August 1915 for Tarquah, Gold Coast, so the samples were certainly made up some time after then.

== Successors ==
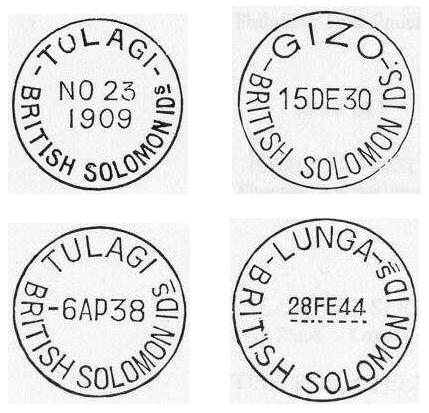
Forged cancels of the British Solomon Islands prepared by Madame Joseph.

Eventually, the business devolved to Gordon Rhodes, who traded from 17A Lime Street, London, and whose shop is recorded in Kelly's Directory from 1935 to 1960. His employee, Cecil Jones, took over the shop after Rhodes died. Jones reportedly used it as a cash-cow to fund his gambling habit. In 1960 the shop changed name to the South London Stamp Company and it is believed that the production of forgeries ended in the 1960s.

== Similar businesses ==
In a letter to The London Philatelist, Ted Proud has referred to two other dealers, known only as "Dealer A" and "Dealer B" who carried out similar activities and used to co-operate. Proud has written that Dealer A had a stock of printers blocks of cancels used to illustrate magazine articles and books who would also cancel unused stamps. He has also written that Dealer B, with whom Madame Joseph unsuccessfully tried to start a stamp "repairing" factory, also had a stock of bogus date-stamps that he said was larger than Madame Joseph's. He is also said to have had a perforating machine which was made by his brother who was a Swiss industrialist. Proud has commented that to say that Madame Joseph's operations were shrouded in secrecy would be an exaggeration and that her business was well known in the stamp trade at the time as one of selling "repaired" stamps with a cancellation service as an extra feature.

Recently the name Eric David Bowie (b. 1900) – City Stamp Shop, 1 St. Swithin's Lane, London EC4, was noted on a newsletter 1 May 1937 advertising Coronation stamps. Bowie was prosecuted for forgery of Silver Jubilee, on the insistence of Robson Lowe.

Bowie had ties with The Broadway Stamp Company and Harris and Whitehurst of Birmingham. He served his time and set up shop in Bermuda c.1939. He served as a Lieutenant at the shore-based HMS Goshawk, Piarco, Trinidad, during WWII – he also sold stamps. Ted Proud notes that Commander E. D. Bowie was in Malaya at war's end.

He returned in 1946 to Bermuda, where he specialized in the stamps of the Japanese Occupation of Malaya – he wrote a short book on the same. He also expertized stamps, most of which appear right.

In February 1961, he visited stamp dealer Everard F. Aguilar in Jamaica. Circa 1963 he removed to the Jersey Rose Farm, where he sold his stock to Harry Martin Jr. of the Empire Stamp Corporation, Toronto. By 1975, Bowie was back in Bermuda, where he continued his ill-tempered spat with Robson Lowe. He was eventually admitted to St. Brendan's Hospital, Bermuda's mental health institution.

== Recent developments ==
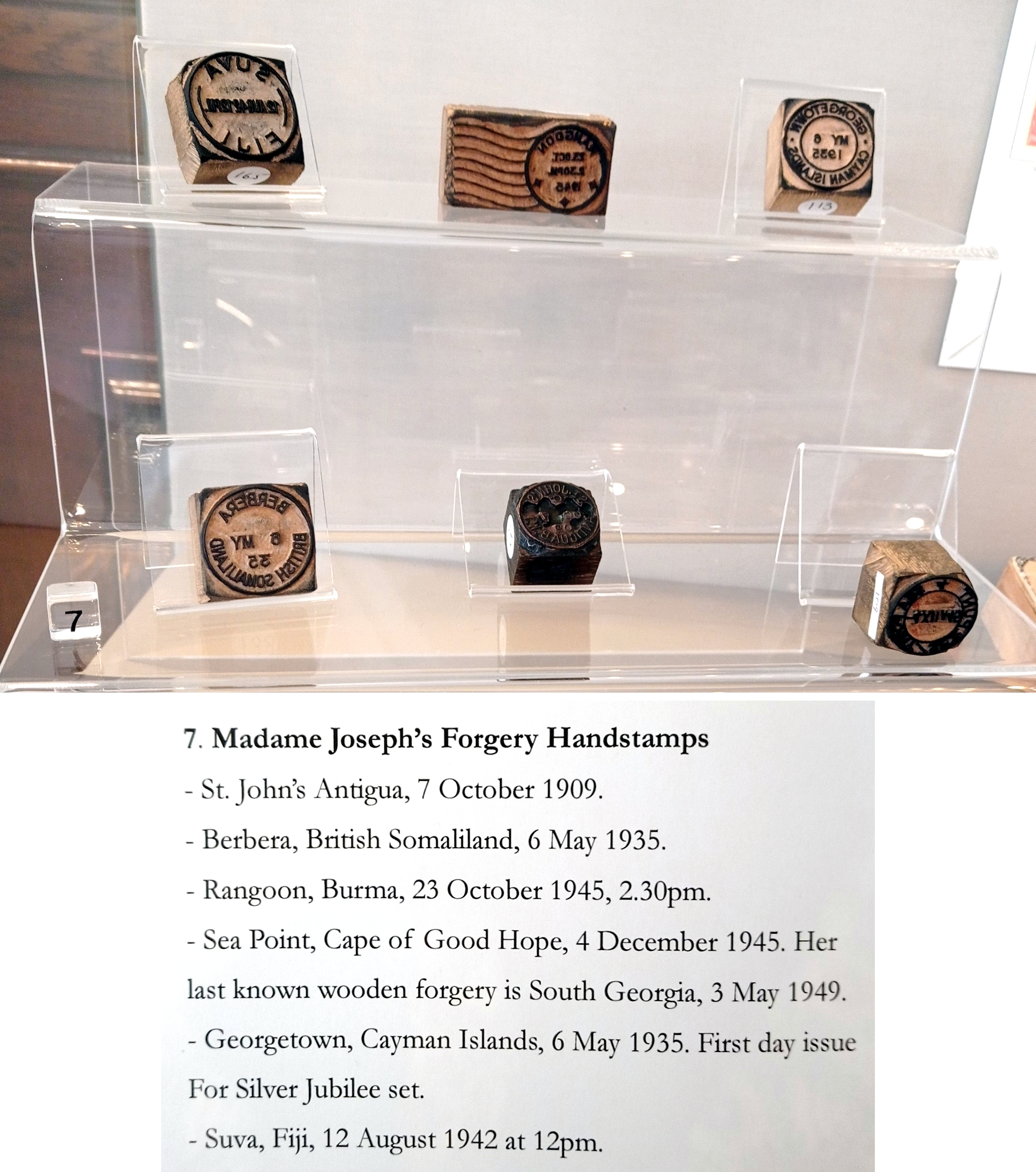
Madame Joseph stamp-cancelling implements at the Royal Philatelic Society London

In the early 1990s, the retired stamp dealer Derek Worboys purchased the Joseph instruments and paraphernalia from Clive Santo in order to prevent their further use. The items were in the estate of Clive's late father George, who died in 1990. Today, the Madame Joseph items reside in the museum of the Royal Philatelic Society London.

== See also ==
- List of stamp forgers
