= N. Imperato =

Nino Imperato (born c. 1890s), normally known just as N. Imperato, was a stamp forger based in Genoa, Italy in the early 1920s.

Like Francois Fournier, Imperato promoted his forgeries as facsimiles available to the collector at a fraction of the cost of the real thing. His house journal, Il-Fac-simile, went through at least nineteen editions between 1920 and 1922. Amongst other content the journal included two short articles by fellow forger (or distributor of forgeries) Angelo Panelli.

== Work ==
Forgeries were produced of a wide range of stamps, including:

- Italian occupation of Austria - 1918 issue overprinted Venezia Giulia and Venezia Tridentina.
- Brazil issues of 1850.
- Eritrea stamps of 1892.
- Honduras issue of 1898.
- Italian offices in the Turkish Empire, stamps of 1908.
- Spain Don Quixote commemoratives of 1905.
- Sicily Neapolitan Provinces stamps of 1861.
- British occupation of Batum 1919.

Many other were offered too but it is thought that they had actually been produced years earlier by Erasmo Oneglia of Turin. Robson Lowe and Carl Walske speculate in their book on Oneglia that he retired around 1920 and it may be around then that Imperato acquired his stock of Oneglia forgeries.
