= Georges Fouré =

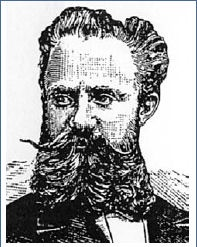
Georges Fouré

Georges Fouré (1848 in Paris-1902) was a 19th-century French-German philatelist and stamp forger.

Fouré lived in Berlin and was the editor of the Berliner Illustrierte Briefmarkenzeitung. As such he introduced his audience to remarkable "discoveries" of stamps of the German States that in reality he had created. He did not imitate known stamps, but like an artist, he created new ones. He took no one in confidence, never disclosed when, where, why or how he did his forgeries.

== See also ==
List of stamp forgers

== References and sources ==
- Gustac Schenk. The Romance of the Postage Stamp. Doubleday and Co, Garden City, NY (1959), p200ff.
- Metz, Reinhard (2009). Georges Fouré: die Geschichte eines genialen Philatelisten und Fälschers (in German). Schwalmtal: Schwalmtal Phil Creativ, Verl. & Agentur. p. 352. ISBN 9783932198847.
