= George Lowden (stamp forger) =

John Stewart "George" Lowden (29 May 1877 – 7 October 1958) was a British stamp dealer who was involved in a number of cases of suspected stamp forgery and eventually jailed for three years for that offence at the Old Bailey in 1913.

== See also ==
- Jonas Lek
