= Sigmund Friedl =

Austrian philatelist (1851–1914)

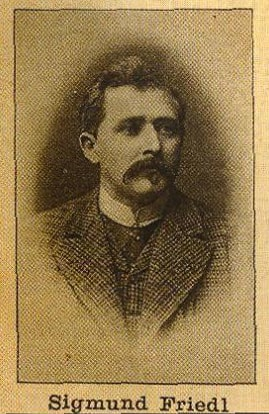
Sigmund Friedl in the 1890s

Sigmund Friedl (1851, Lipník nad Bečvou, Moravia – 1914, Vienna) was one of the most famous Austrian philatelists. Toward the end of his life he defrauded stamp collectors by selling them forgeries.

Sigmund Friedl's interest in postage stamps started already at the age of 13. Only two years later, he started trading them. In 1872, he opened his own stamp shop in Vienna. Soon he became a stamp expert and started working as an examiner. He had great success with his shop, for example, he sold the unique Tre Skilling Banco for a sum of 4,000 florins to the famous collector, Philipp von Ferrary. Through his good relationship with the post, he was able to cheaply obtain the remaining stocks of several postage stamps and resell them.

At the same time, he wrote the first Austrian stamp catalogues and enhanced the stamp albums. Finally, Sigmund Friedl established his own stamp museum in his villa in Unterdöbling. In 1881 and 1890, he organised the first major Austrian stamp exhibitions, which also attracted international attention.

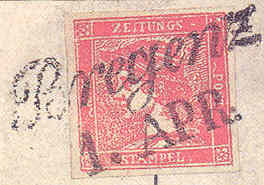
Friedl forgery of the Red Mercury.

To Austrian philatelists, Sigmund Friedl is known mainly for his Friedl perforations and the disreputable Friedl forgeries. The Friedl perforations are private perforations of Austrian definitive stamps, which were tolerated by the post. The Friedl perforations always had a different number of perfs than the original perforation of the definitive stamp series made by the post. The forged stamps were mainly forgeries of the Mercury series issued in 1851, which were sold to collectors with fraudulent intent. After the deception was exposed, Friedl had to buy back some of these stamps.

== See also ==
- List of stamp forgers
