= Imperato =

Imperato is an Italian surname. Notable people with the surname include:

- N. Imperato, stamp forger based in Genoa, Italy, in the early 1920s
- Ferrante Imperato (c. 1525–1615), apothecary of Naples
- Pascal James Imperato (born 1937), doctor and professor of tropical medicine and public health
- Tommaso Imperato (1596–1656), Roman Catholic prelate
