= Russian philatelic forgeries =

Russian stamps have been extensively forged. Both rare and common stamps have been forged and certain stamps, for instance those of the Army of the North, are more common forged than genuine.

== Types ==
Forgeries of Russian stamps can be divided into the following categories:

- Forgeries of a basic stamp. These are not so common. Examples include François Fournier's forgeries of the 3.50R and 7R high value stamps "without thunderbolts" and the Rostov famine issue of the early 1920s. Some issues of the Civil War have also been forged, such as the definitives issued by Azerbaijan, Georgia and Armenia.
- Forgeries of an overprint or surcharge on a common basic stamp. The Civil War period is particularly full of these. Overprinted stamps issued by the various "White" Armies have also been forged extensively. The stamps issued by the North-West Armies were particularly popular with the forgers, and dozens of different forgeries have been identified.
- Forgeries of a perforation. There have been many attempts to "create" a stamp with a rare perforation by taking an imperforate version of the stamp and forging the perforation. Examples include the Zeppelin issues of the early 1930s, many of which exist with a forged perf 11 1/2. Forging the perforation also allows for perforation varieties to be created to order.
- Forgeries of a postmark on a loose stamp. A notorious batch of these are the "Shtempelgate" forgeries of rare postmarks from the Russian Offices Abroad, usually on common 1 Ruble stamps.
- Stamps of the Russian Zemstvo local posts have also been forged.

== Gallery ==
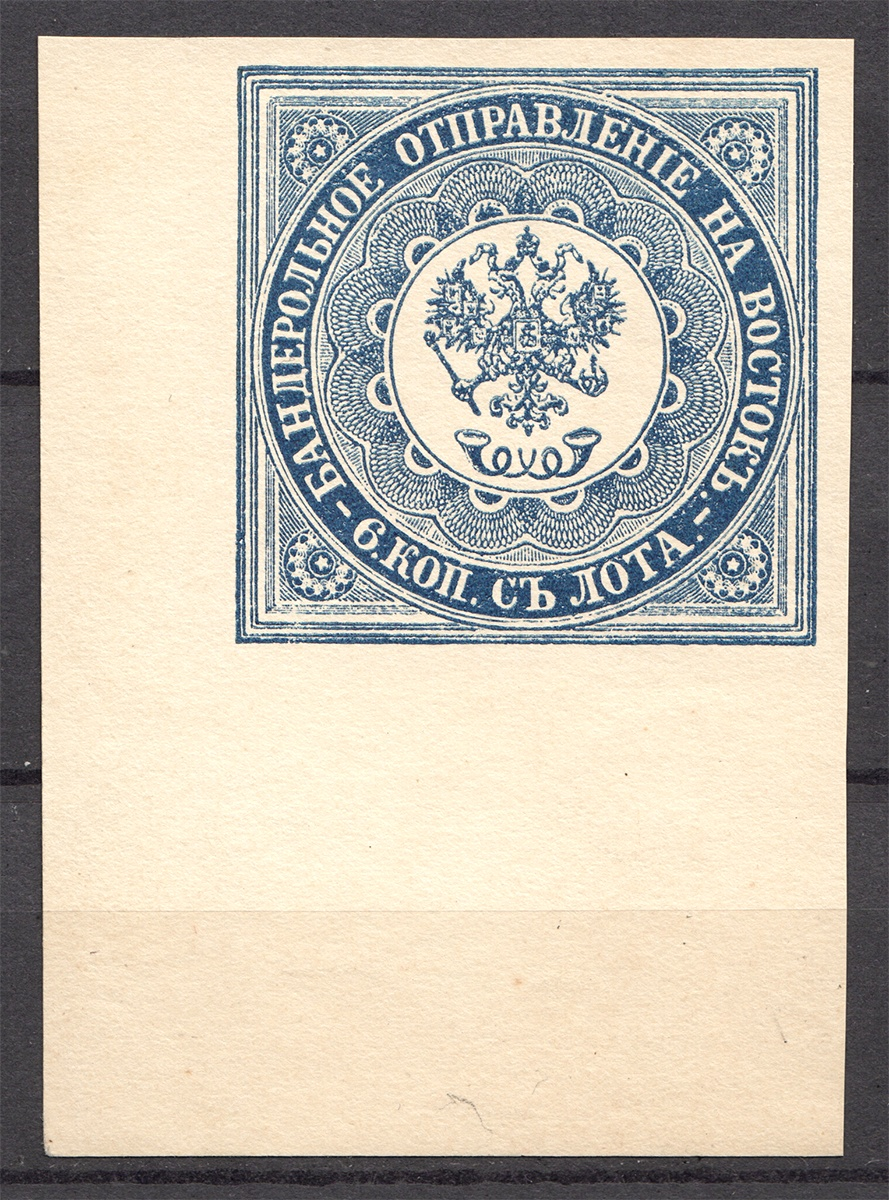
1863 Russia Levant offices in Turkey 3rd Issue forgery.

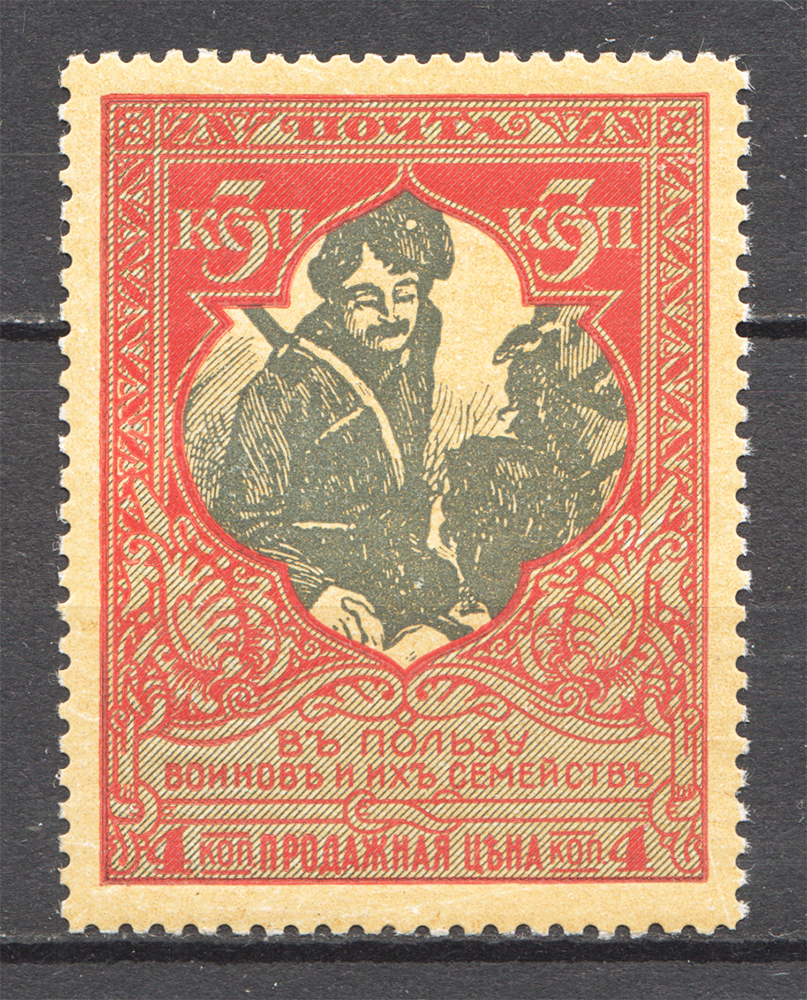
Counterfeit of Russia charity issue with rare perforation 12,5.

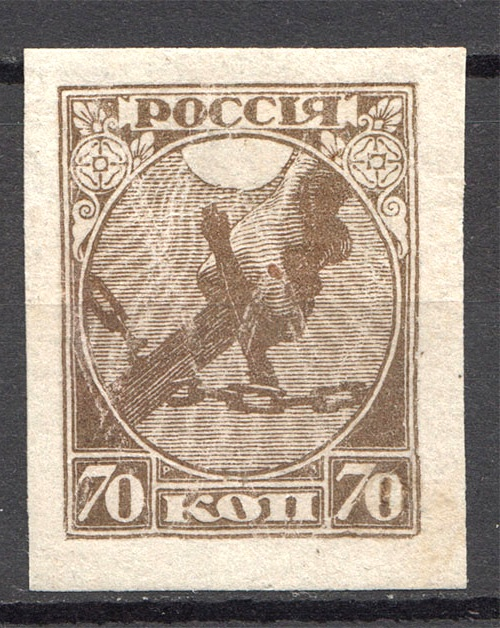
1918 RSFSR 70 kop imperforated stamp forgery.

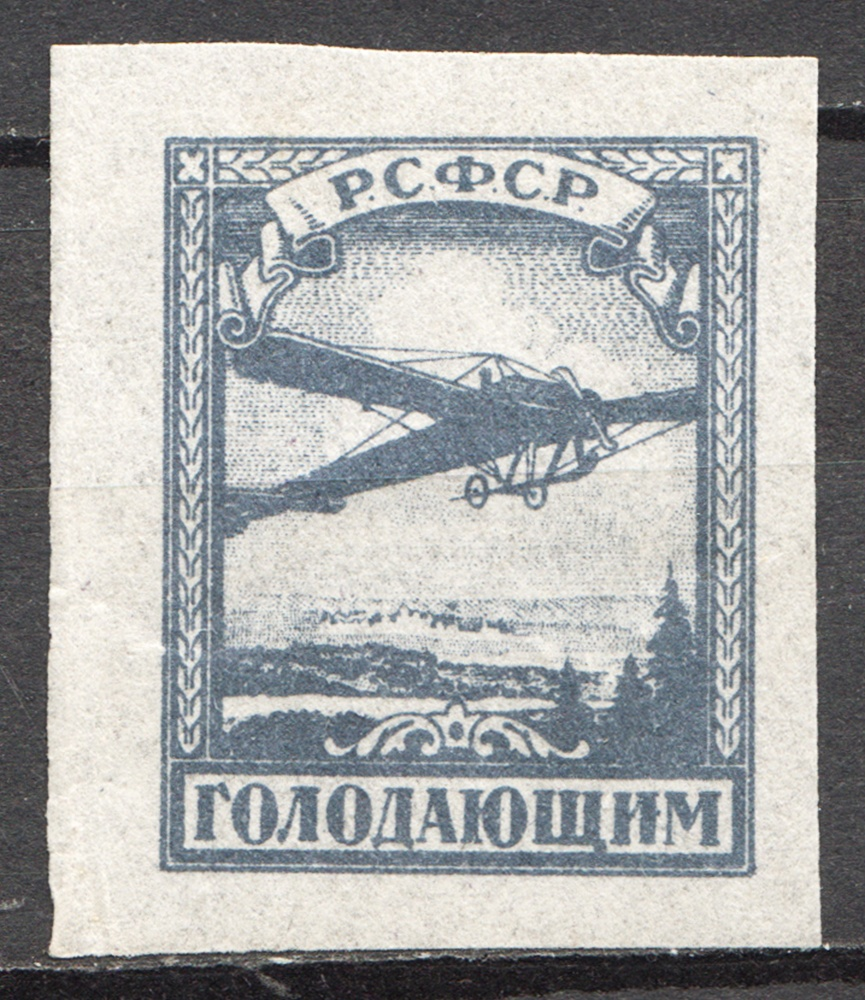
1922 RSFSR relief for starving issue old forgery.

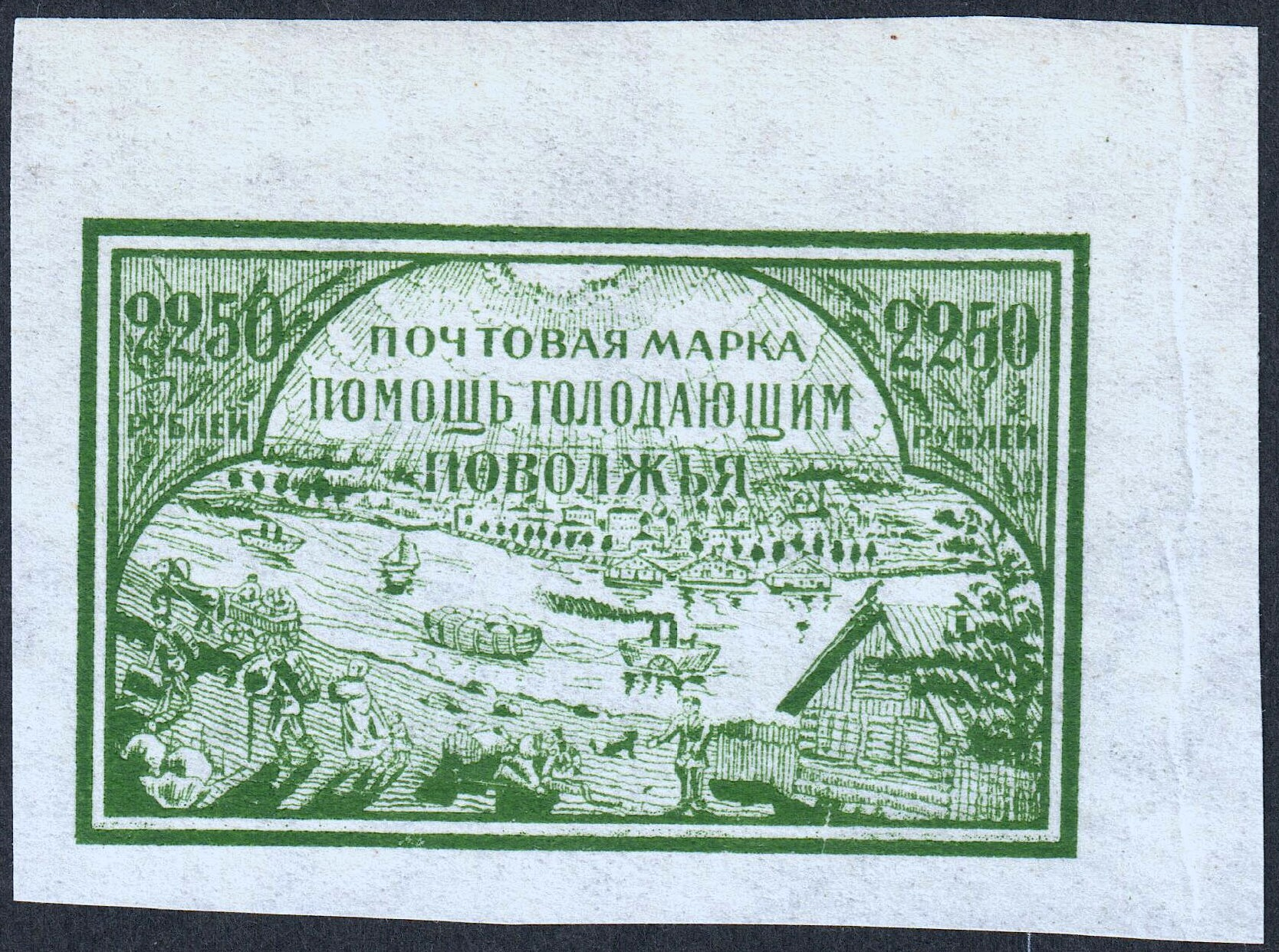
Counterfeit of basic Russia 1921 issue, Volga Famin Relief. 2250 rubel green.

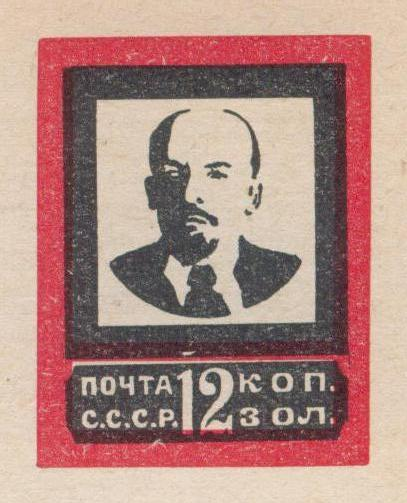
Counterfeit of basic Russia 1924 issue Lenin, 12 kopecks.

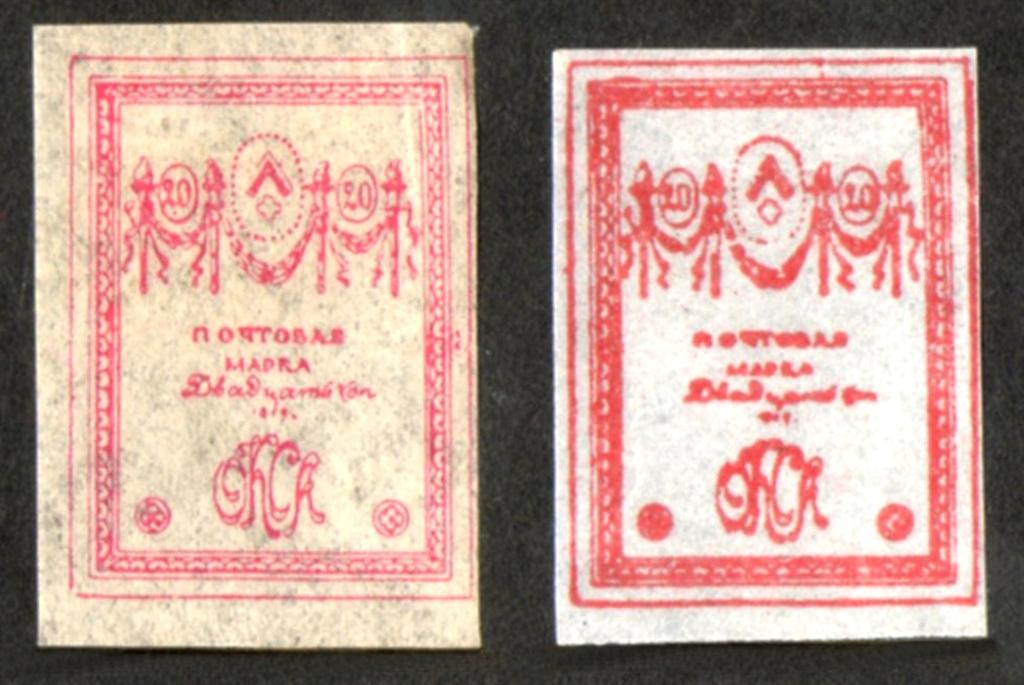
Genuine (left) and forged (right) 1919 Russian Army of the North 20k stamps. Note the cruder printing on the forgery. (Scott No.4)

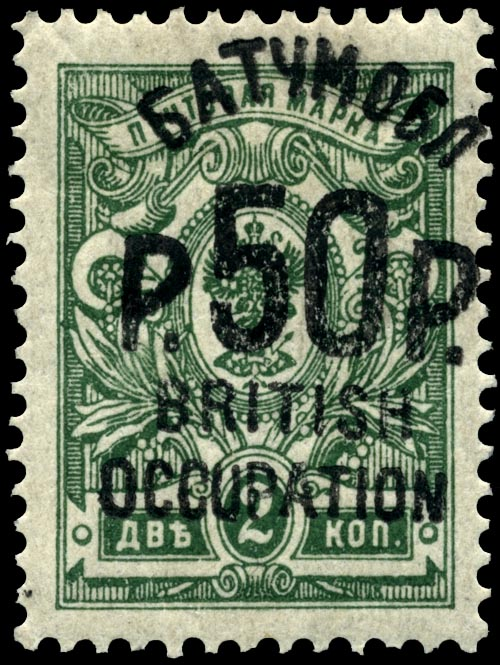
50 rubles on 2 kopecks stamp of imperial Russia, Batum, 1919 forged overprint.

== See also ==
- Illegal stamps
- List of stamp forgers
- Philatelic expertisation
- Philatelic fakes and forgeries
- Postage stamps and postal history of Russia
