= Plácido Ramón de Torres =

Spanish stamp forger (c. 1847 – c. 1910s)

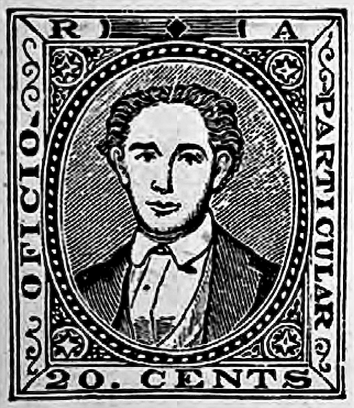
- Self-portrait, c. 1874
- Born: Ramón Antonio Plácido de Torres; Estepona, Málaga, Spain
- Baptised: September 1847
- Died: c. 1910s
- Other name: Rosendo Fernández
- Occupations: Stamp illustrator; dealer; forger
- Notable work: Álbum Ilustrado para sellos de correo (1879)

Ramón Antonio Plácido de Torres (c. 1847 – c. 1910s), known as Plácido Ramón de Torres, was a Spanish stamp illustrator, dealer, and forger.

He was a foundling who was adopted as an infant by Ramón Domingo de Torres of Estepona, Spain. Nothing else is known of his youth. He or the family moved to Italy and in the 1860s Torres was working as an apprentice lithographer when he met the book editor Elia Carlo Usigli for whom he produced illustrations of stamps that were used worldwide in stamp collecting publications.

With Usigli and others, Torres gradually moved from illustrating stamps to forging them. He had shops in Italy and later Spain, and sold forgeries in those countries and on foreign selling trips. He was also involved in a number of schemes of doubtful legality, such as the sale to collectors of stamps for Andorra before the authorities had approved them and which ultimately were not approved. He forged Italian municipal revenue stamps. He was arrested three times. In 1874, he was forced to leave Italy for his native Spain where he lived in Barcelona for the rest of his life. His date of death is unknown.

It has been estimated by his biographer Gerhard Lang-Valchs that 10% of the forgeries on the philatelic market are the work of Torres.

== Early life and family ==
Plácido Ramón de Torres was a foundling, adopted by Ramón Domingo de Torres of Estepona in the province of Málaga, in southern Spain. He was likely born in 1847, the year in which he was baptised at the Church of Santa María de los Remedios in Estepona. His date of birth and biological parents are unknown. On adoption he received only his new father's name, contrary to Spanish naming customs, raising speculation about the family situation of his adoptive father.

Little is known of Torres' personal life but he may have married María Ruiz Gutiérrez around 1880. A death certificate for Torres' wife and son in Cuba in 1891 was found by the Spanish vice-consul of St. Louis who had cause to examine his luggage. Torres was on a selling trip to the Americas in that year.

== Career ==
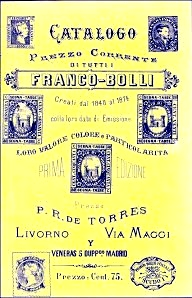
Torres 1873 stamp catalogue

In about 1862s Torres was an apprentice lithographer when he met the book editor Elia Carlo Usigli (1812–1894) who was also one of the first Italian stamp dealers. Usigli recognised Torres's talent as an illustrator and arranged for him to produce illustrations of stamps for Jean-Baptiste Moens magazine Le Timbre-Poste in 1863 and his catalogue of 1864. Acceptance by Moens enabled Usigli to place Torres illustrations in the magazines of other dealers such as Arthur Maury, Pierre Mahé, Henry Stafford Smith and Stanley Gibbons so that they were propagated internationally.

=== Livorno ===
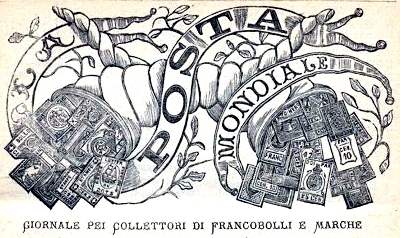
Masthead of La Posta Mondiale

By 1871–72, Torres was running a stationery shop in Livorno (Leghorn), on the western coast of Italy, in cooperation with Usigli. He also sold stamps and with Usigli came up with a plan to supply free revenue stamps to Italian municipalities, which Torres designed, in return for the right to sell the stamps into the philatelic market. By then he had changed the order of his name to Plácido Ramón de Torres, which Gerhard Lang-Valchs has speculated may have been to give himself the appearance of a double surname (Ramon and Torres) in order to hide his likely illegitimacy.

In 1873, Torres successfully published his first catalogue which went through two more editions. The first edition, in common with many other early stamp catalogues, was not illustrated except for on the cover. In July that year, he also began to publish the stamp collecting journal La Posta Mondiale which offered stamps for sale, a lithographed page of the stamps discussed in the journal, and correspondence from collectors. Packets of mixed stamps were offered as well as special arrangements for other dealers. The focus of the magazine was on Italy and Spain with a significant amount of coverage of revenue stamps, too much in the opinion of The Stamp-Collector's Magazine, who otherwise welcomed the magazine, but commented that the less said of its coverage of Italian revenues and municipal stamps, the better. He established a philatelic club in his premises where collectors could meet.

=== Beginning to forge ===
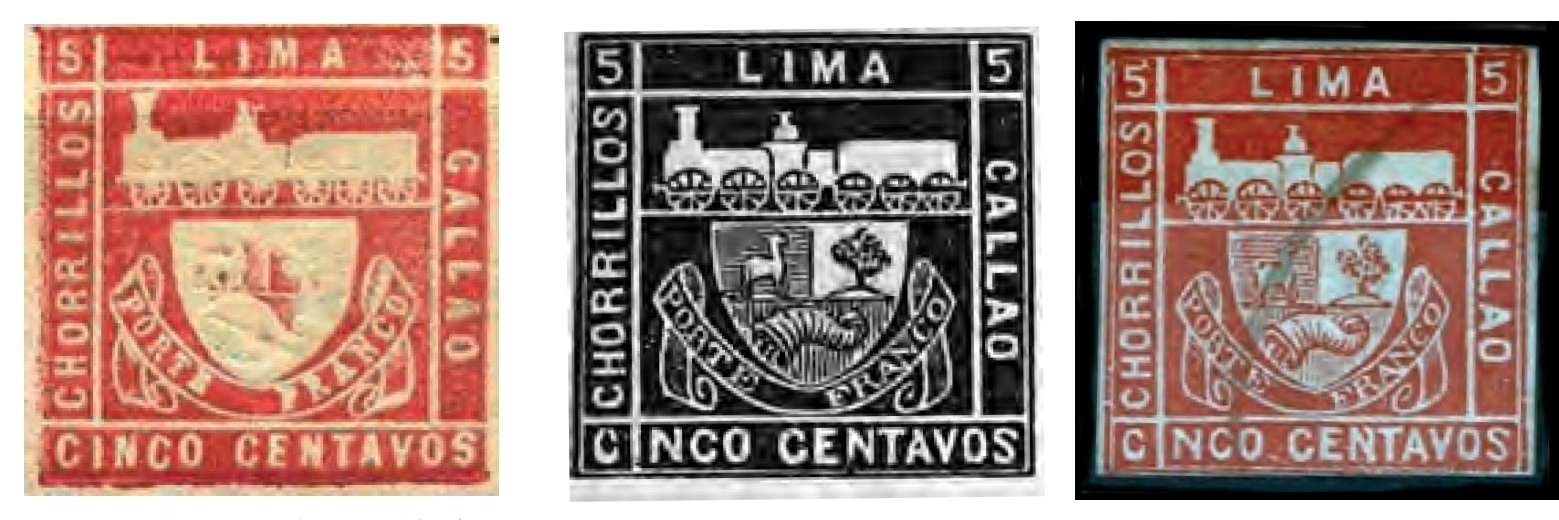
The 1870 5c Trencito stamp of Peru with genuine on the left, black and white Torres illustration centre and Torres forgery right.

It was Elia Usigli who first sold on as genuine, proofs of illustrations that Torres had prepared for publication, but the pair soon began to collaborate on producing and selling a wide variety of forged stamps. Usigli recruited into the scheme his old friend Count Cesare Bonasi and Bonasi's wife Angela Candini who went on trips throughout Italy and central Europe selling the forgeries. Unlike some other producers, for instance the Spiro Brothers of Hamburg, there was no attempt to identify the stamps as facsimiles.

=== Catania elephants ===
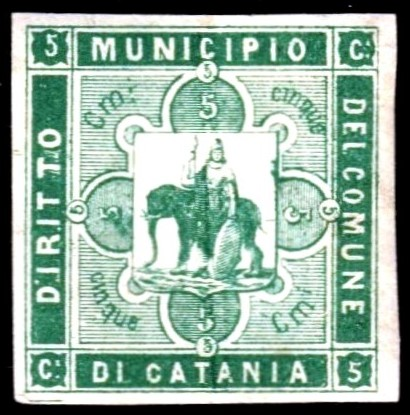
Catania 5c revenue stamp essay, 1873

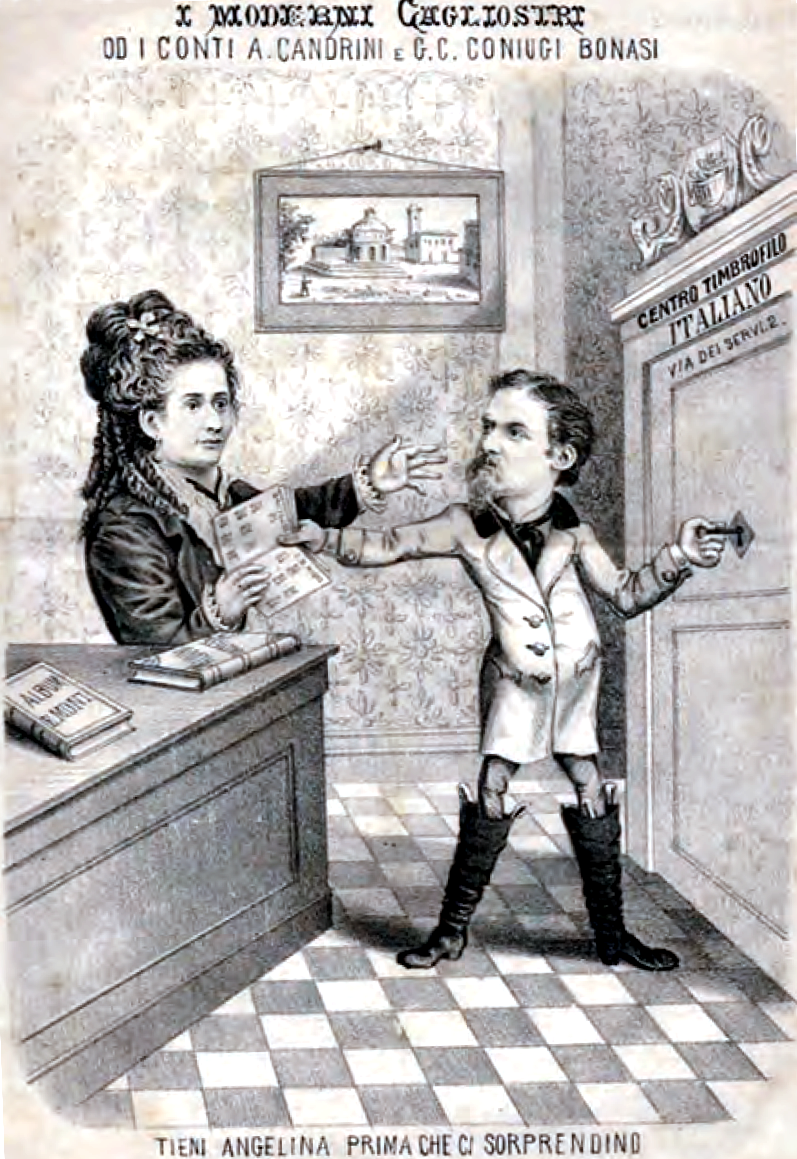
An illustration in Torres's pamphlet I Moderni Cagliostri showing Cesare Bonasi and his wife Angela Candini "Tieni Angelina prima che ci sorprendino"

At the end of 1873, Torres sent the municipality of Catania proofs of a set of revenue stamps that he had prepared for their use. They show an elephant as appears in the coat of arms of the municipality. Torres and his collaborators began to sell the stamps to collectors without waiting for the municipality to approve them, and when Le Timbre Fiscal revealed in Spring 1874 that the stamps were not approved, he was obliged to offer to buy back those he had sold in advance. The main distribution of the stamps, however, had been by Bonasi and his wife, and they were not disposed to refund anyone. There was also the additional fraudulent sales of fakes by Bonasi in Italy and elsewhere. In the ensuing scandal, Torres relocated his shop and cancelled the next issue of his magazine. Finally, in an attempt to clear his name, he published a pamphlet I Moderni Cagliostri od i conti A. Candrini e G.C. Coniugi Bonasi (A Modern Cagliostro), condemning the activities of Bonasi and his wife which brought an end to his relationship with them and Usigli. At the end of 1874, Torres returned to Spain.

=== Return to Spain ===
Back in Spain, at the end of 1874 Torres opened a shop in Barcelona named Centro General Timbrológico Español. In international dealings he used the name Rosendo Fernández, the name of a business colleague and friend with whom he was later arrested for the Melila affair. He continued to supply philatelic publishers with illustrations of stamps, including John Walter Scott, founder of the Scott catalogue, who published them in the American Journal of Philately. Another of his enterprises during this time was the purchase in 1876 of up to 100,000, by now almost worthless, unused stamps of the defeated Carlist rebels from the Third Carlist War. The stamps were falsely cancelled by Torres to make them more valuable.

Gerhard Lang-Valchs estimates that Torres produced at least 5,500 stamp illustrations for the publications of Jean-Baptiste Moens. They only needed to be good enough to identify the stamp, however, Lang-Valchs has identified an unusually high error rate that he believes cannot be explained by accident, and as the illustrations were used in publications by other dealers too, the erroneous illustrations were widely distributed. Many were spotted at the time and Moens was obliged to print explanations in his magazine, such as that the illustrator had a bad cold when doing his work. Suspicions that the errors are deliberate are bolstered by changes that appear to be jokes, such as substituting a laughing face for a fleur-de-lis on one stamp. In a stamp of Haiti, the cap of liberty is pointing in the wrong direction. Torres conspired with Moens to produce fantasy stamps that other catalogue publishers then wrongly included in their next edition, such as an imaginary stamp of Andorra, thus showing the competitors to have plagiarised Moens's work. He collaborated with forgers David Kohn in Berlin and Julius Goldner in Hamburg, and probably with Swiss forger Francois Fournier.

In 1879, Torres published a world stamp album titled Álbum Ilustrado para sellos de correo. It has been described as the first really modern stamp album as its 260 pages are illustrated with stamps throughout – the illustrations produced by Torres, organised by continent, with a space for each value, room for new issues, and an index. Its success was limited, however, by the text being only in Spanish.

=== European selling trip ===
In October 1886, Torres began a European selling trip, starting in Ipswich, on the east coast of England, where his accomplice and translator Attilio Biffo, an Italian waiter working in England, visited the dealers Whitfield King and Co. Stating that he was acting for Torres's alias of Rosendo Fernández, Biffo presented a variety of genuine and fake material, accepting a reduced offer for an immediate payment without expertisation of the items. By the time the forgeries were detected, the duo had already left England. They carried out similar frauds in Belgium, the Netherlands, and Denmark, but were arrested in Germany to where news of their activities had already spread. Torres was convicted on three charges and sentenced by the Supreme Criminal Court of Bremen to seven months in jail and a fine of 1,200 marks for fraud and attempted fraud. The stamps he had sold in Germany were seized but an order to seize the rest of his stock, mainly Spanish forgeries numbering around 4,000, was not carried out as Torres had already left the country. The judge appointed to the trial was a philatelic expert and was able to identify and list the forged stamps in question.

=== Andorra ===
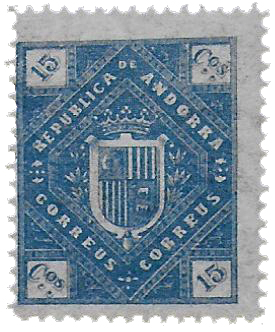
An unissued stamp for the Republic of Andorra

In 1890, Torres proposed to the Andorran general council that the tiny state, positioned between France and Spain, issue its first postage stamps. Torres produced essays which were eventually approved and printed in 12 values in various colours. The paper is watermarked AR which Gerhard Lang-Valchs interprets as Andorra Republic rather than Argentine Republic as is sometimes supposed. In 1896 these essays were presented to the state's general assembly with the support of its Syndic General, where they were unanimously approved.

Curiously, however, Torres designs refer to Andorra as a republic, despite it being a co-principality shared by the Bishop of Urgel in Spain and the President of France, of which fact Torres must have been aware. Christer Brunström has suggested that the use of the word republic may have been a deliberate error on Torres part in order to pander to Andorran republican or independence sentiment. Despite approval by the assembly, the stamps were subsequently rejected by the French. The stamp issue was thus shelved but later found its way on to the philatelic market. Andorra did not issue its own postage stamps until the 1920s (Spain) and 1930s (France) when a dual postal system run by those countries was established in the state.

=== American selling trip ===
Towards the end of 1891, Torres sailed for North America from Barcelona on a selling trip. He visited Mexican dealers and was able to leave the country without being arrested. In Galveston, Texas, dealer Vincent Gurdji denounced him to the police who obtained an arrest warrant from the local court. Torres had meanwhile moved on to the St. Louis stamp dealer Charles Mekeel, announcing his visit in advance. Mekeel, aware of Torres activities, informed the police who arrested Torres and transported him back to Galveston. A deal was done with Mekeel whereby the charges were dropped and Mekeel bought all of Torres remaining stock and paid the import duties that the customs authorities had charged after becoming aware of it. Torres returned to Spain.

=== Melilla ===
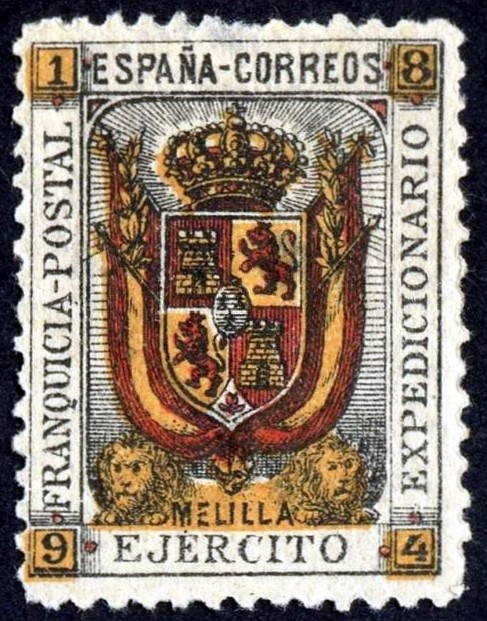
A Torres Melilla stamp

In 1893–94, Spain was engaged in the Margallo War, centred around the Spanish enclave of Melilla in North Africa which came under attack by local tribesmen. In 1893, Torres approached the Melilla garrison commander with an offer of free stamps and stationery for the soldiers, which the commander accepted without reference to the Spanish postal authorities. Torres produced 51 different types of stamp which were supplied to the soldiers who applied them to the envelopes and used them to write home, despite their mail already being free of charge. Their letters served to legitimise the stamps and give them value in the philatelic market. In addition, Torres produced extra mail pieces which were sent to his friends and associates and retained many stamps for sale to collectors.

Varro E. Tyler credits the idea for the scheme to the forger Miguel Rodriguez Sanchez, who worked with post office employee Gabriel Jumanez who procured cancellers for the manufactured covers. The Philatelic Journal of America, writing in 1894, also attributed the whole scheme to Sanchez and additionally reprinted in translation the official decree by which the soldiers' mail could have been sent free of charge. Torres and his collaborators were all arrested in April 1894 when they visited the Malaga post office to pick up a fake canceller that they had ordered. They were released, however, within days when Torres was able to produce his military authorisation to create the stamps.

== Later years and legacy ==
Torres seems to have ceased in business, or died, around the start of the twentieth century. Jean-Baptiste Moens, one of Torres's major clients, closed his business in 1899, and a kiosk Torres shared with Guillermo de Pécker in central Barcelona was probably closed in 1903. In 1908, he appeared on a list of the members of the citizens committee at his home of Pino Street 6 in Barcelona, but nothing later is known of him.

Torres received a short, and probably unreliable, biography from José Majó Tocabens and Andrés Majó Díaz in 1975. In 2020 he was the subject of a full-length biography by Gerhard Lang-Valchs. In 2023 it was estimated by Lang-Valchs that 10% of the forgeries on the philatelic market are the work of Torres.
