= Jonas Lek =

Dutch diamond merchant and collector

Jonas Lek was a Dutch diamond merchant and collector who was involved in an insurance loss case that reached the House of Lords in the United Kingdom in 1927.

== Philately ==
In 1913 Jonas Lek of Holland Park Gardens was the buyer from George Lowden of a parcel of 2679 £1 stamps of King Edward VII, all with a Jersey postmark, for £830. Both the stamps and the postmarks were found to be forgeries resulting in Lowden's conviction for selling forgeries contrary to the Stamp Act. Lowden was sentenced to three years penal servitude.

In his insurance loss case, Lek was represented by Reginald Croom-Johnson, himself a noted philatelist with a specialist collection of the British Solomon Islands.
