= A. A. Jurgens =

South African philatelist (1886–1953)

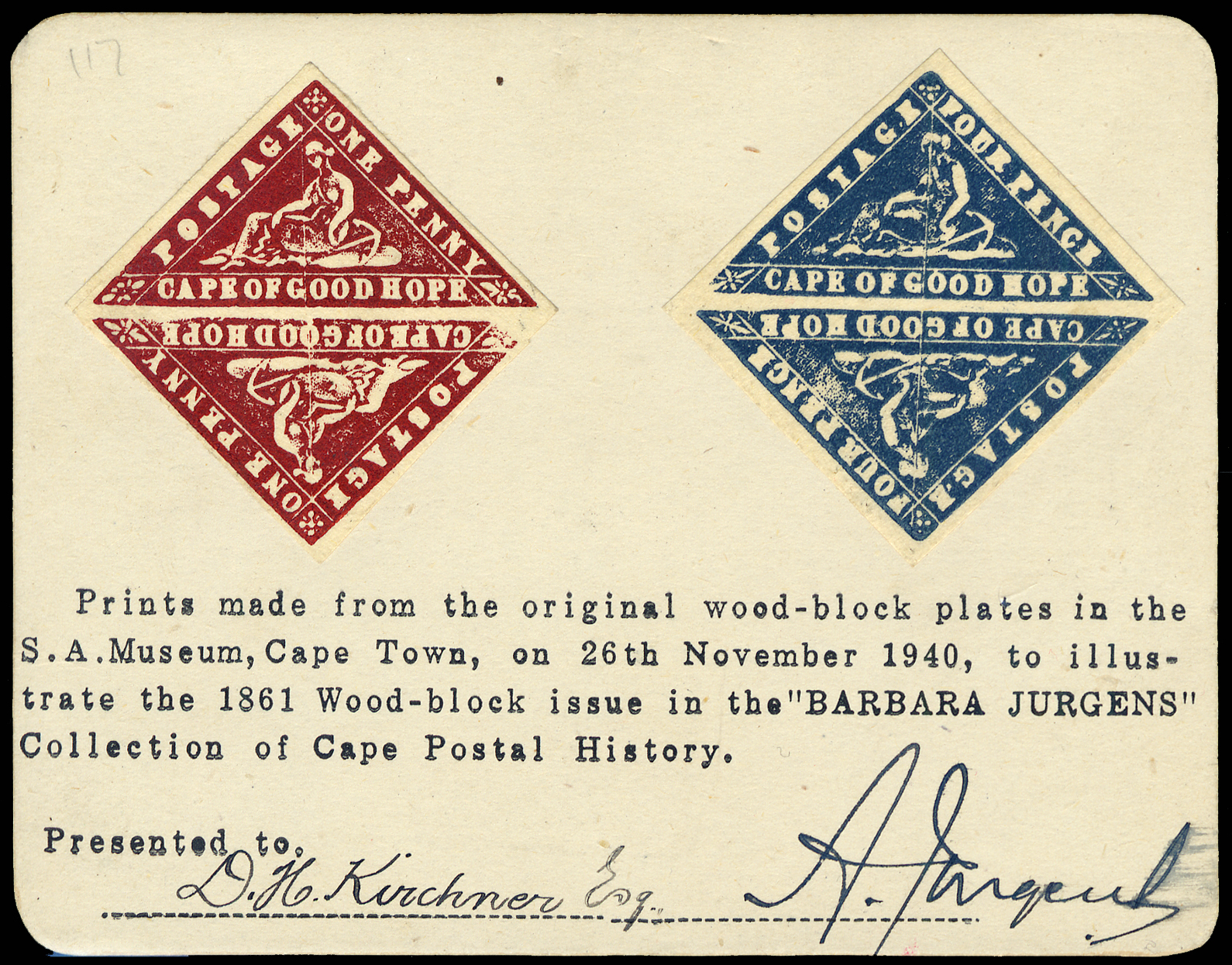
Reprints of Cape of Good Hope stamps. Collection of Barbara Jurgens.

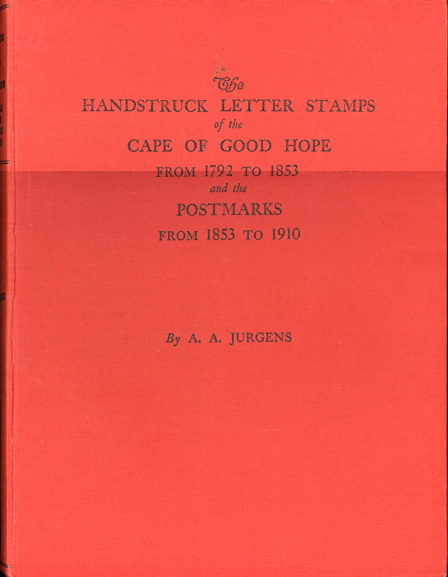
The cover of Jurgens' The Handstruck Letter Stamps of the Cape of Good Hope.

Adrian Albert Jurgens (1886 – 11 July 1953) was a South African philatelist and signatory to the Roll of Distinguished Philatelists of Southern Africa in 1948 and the Roll of Distinguished Philatelists in Great Britain in 1952.

In the 1940s Jurgens became embroiled in allegations of forgery that greatly damaged his reputation.

== Work ==
Jurgens' main area of interest was the philately of Southern Africa, in particular the Bechuanalands and Cape of Good Hope, and the A.A. Jurgens – Cape of Good Hope, Barbara Jurgens Memorial Collection of twenty volumes is in the Iziko Museums of Cape Town.

In 1944 Jurgens won the Crawford Medal from the Royal Philatelic Society London for his work The Handstruck Letter Stamps of the Cape of Good Hope from 1792 to 1853 and the Postmarks from 1853 to 1910.

== Allegations ==
In 1941 philatelists became aware of reprints of the 1 penny and 4 penny Cape of Good Hope 'woodblock' triangular stamps in the original colours. Although the original stereos had been defaced with a vertical line, the line did not appear correctly on the reprints, which were perilously similar to the originals.

The originator of the reprints was revealed to be A.A. Jurgens who described everything he had done in an article in The South African Philatelist in May 1941. Jurgens explained that he had received permission to make reprints in black from the Director of the South African Museum in Cape Town which were to be displayed in a case with South African postal history material.

Unfortunately, Jurgens appears to have got carried away with his initial success and he also produced reprints in red and blue and on wove and laid papers. Up to 17 sheets were produced. This had all been done in November 1940 and March 1941, without the knowledge of the philatelic community. Further allegations relating to forged cancellations on Cape material and a public spat with the expert committee of the British Philatelic Association did nothing to help Jurgens' reputation.

Robson Lowe famously declined to sign the Roll of Distinguished Philatelists due to the organisers' failure to delete Jurgens' name. Lowe regarded Jurgens as a forger.

Although a Fellow of the Royal Philatelic Society London since 1938, no obituary for Jurgens appeared in The London Philatelist following his death.

== Publications ==
- Cape of Good Hope Pre-cancellations.
- The Handstruck Letter Stamps of the Cape of Good Hope from 1792 to 1853 and the Postmarks from 1853 to 1910, Cape Town, 1943.
- The Bechuanalands: A brief history of the countries and their postal services to 1895. Including information about the postage stamps, postmarks, forgeries and revenue stamps., Royal Philatelic Society, London, 1946.
