= Robson Lowe =

English philatelist, stamp dealer and auctioneer (1905–1997)

- Born: John Harry Robson Lowe; January 7, 1905
- Died: October 19, 1997 (aged 92)
- Other names: Robbie
- Occupations: Philatelist; Stamp dealer
- Years active: 1926–1997
- Known for: Philatelic literature
- Notable work: The Encyclopaedia of British Empire Postage Stamps

John Harry Robson Lowe (7 January 1905, London – 19 August 1997, Bournemouth) was an English professional philatelist, stamp dealer and stamp auctioneer.

== Life and career ==
Robson Lowe is regarded by philatelists as the father of postal history, having published many definitive works on the subject and having introduced the term in his first major book Handstruck Postage Stamps of the Empire 1680–1900 in 1948. In 1970 he was awarded the Lichtenstein Medal by the Collectors Club of New York.

He started his philatelic career at Fox & Co. in 1926 and then established his own firm, Robson Lowe Ltd., in Regent Street, London, in 1926. He moved to 50 Pall Mall in 1940 and ran an auction business from Bournemouth starting in 1945. For health reasons he was unable to serve in the military during World War Two. Lowe refused to sign the Roll of Distinguished Philatelists due to the refusal of the organisers to remove the name of South African Adrian Albert Jurgens, whom he considered a stamp forger.

Lowe was a larger-than-life character and something of a raconteur. According to one story, while playing cards in South Africa, and possibly after several drinks, he won an orange farm, but was able subsequently to swap it for a stamp collection.

As well as being a pioneer in postal history, Lowe was one of the first to recognise the potential of revenue philately which had been long neglected. In 1990, he was the first President of The Revenue Society.

== Publications ==
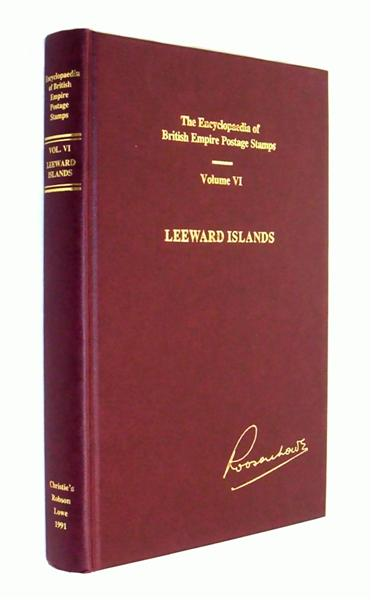
Volume VI of Lowe's Encyclopedia of British Empire Postage Stamps, Leeward Islands, with his trademark signature on the cover.

Lowe was responsible for the publication of many of the key works in philately. His personal magnum opus was The Encyclopaedia of British Empire Postage Stamps which he never quite finished but which stands as a monument to his life's work. The encyclopaedia was based on the earlier Regent series. In 1974 he received the Crawford Medal for Volume 5 of The Encyclopaedia of British Empire Postage Stamps and in 1991 he became the first stamp dealer to be made an Honorary member of the Royal Philatelic Society London.

- The Encyclopaedia of British Empire Postage Stamps. London: Robson Lowe
  - Vol. 1, Great Britain and the Empire in Europe, 1948. (Second edition 1952; 456p.)
  - Vol. 2, The Empire In Africa, 1949.
  - Vol. 3, The Empire in Asia, 1951.
  - Vol. 4, The Empire in Australasia, 1962. (Supplement 1976)
  - Vol. 5, North America, 1973. (One volume ordinary edition and two volume deluxe edition)
  - Vol. 6, Leeward Islands. London: Christie's Robson Lowe, 1991 ISBN 0-85397-437-3, 293p.
- The Regent Catalogue of Empire Postage Stamps. London: Robson Lowe, 1932–49.
- The Regent Encyclopaedia of Empire Postage Stamps. London: Halcyon Book Company Ltd., 1935. 240p.
- The Romance of the Empire Posts. London: Robson Lowe Ltd., 193? 9p.
- The Bishop Mark. London: Robson Lowe, 1937. 20p.
- Handstruck Postage Stamps of the Empire 1680–1900. London: Herbert Joseph Ltd., 1937. 246p. (Second edition 1938, 310p.) (Third edition 1940, 330p. with a 1943 supplement)
- The Handstruck Postage Stamps of 1840. London: Robson Lowe, 1938. 16p.
- Masterpieces of Engraving on Postage Stamps, 1840–1940. London: The Postal History Society, 1943 96p.
- The Systematic Study of Postal History: A paper read at the Society's meeting, 3 April 1946. Edinburgh: R. Stewart, 1946 4p.
- How Rare Stamps and Collections are sold. London: Robson Lowe, 1947. 15p.
- The Codrington Correspondence, 1743–1851: being a study of a recently discovered dossier of letters from the West Indian islands of Antigua and Barbuda, mostly addressed to the Codringtons of Dodington with especial reference to the history of those adventurous times and the hitherto unrecorded postal history of the Antiguan mail. London: Robson Lowe, 1951. 112p.
- The Work of Jean de Sperati. London: British Philatelic Association, 1955–56. 214 p. with 143 plates.
- The Colonial Posts in the United States of America, 1606–1783. Co-Author: Kay Horowicz. London: Robson Lowe, 1967. 52p.
- British Postage Stamps of the 19th Century. London: National Postal Museum, 1st ed. 1968, 2nd ed. 1979.
- The Kings of Egypt and Their Stamps 1860–1960: from a collection based on the study formed by the late A S Mackenzie-Low. London: Robson Lowe, 1969. 40p.
- The Harrisons of Waterlows: A record of the engravers T.S. Harrison and his son Ronald when employed by Waterlow Brows. and Layton Ltd. of London, 1897–1912: Also essays for the postage stamps of the Australian Commonwealth made by Ronald G. Harrison. London: Robson Lowe, 1970 12p.
- 1922 Ireland 1972. Printed by Woods of Perth, 1972. 12p.
- Brunei 1895 Star and Crescent Issue: the history and a plating study. s.l.: Robson Lowe, 1973.
- Transvaal, 1878–1880. s.l.: R. Lowe, 1973.
- The Uganda Missionaries. London: Robson Lowe, 1974. 8p.
- The De La Rue Key Plates:based on the notes of James Ronald Whitfield. London: R. Lowe, 1979 ISBN 0-85397-079-3, 8p.
- Indian Field Post Offices 1903–04: the Aden-Yemeni Boundary Commission, the Somaliland Field Force. London: R. Lowe, 1979 ISBN 0-85397-107-2, 8p.
- The Gee-Ma Forgeries: China 1897–1949: with border areas, Manchuria, Taiwan and Yunnan; Japanese occupation of Brunei, Burma, China, Malaya; Great Britain and 24 possessions; cancellations of China & Tibet, 325 forgeries and 17 cancellations illustrated. London: Robson Lowe, 1980 ISBN 0-85397-106-4, 10p. Forged overprints and cancellations of China, Japanese Occupation, Great Britain and Tibet.
- Newspaper Postage Stamps: The De La Rue Dies 1860–1870. London: Pall Mall Stamp Co. for Robson Lowe, 1980 ISBN 0-85397-184-6, 8p.
- From China and Tibet: A commentary on letters written by missionaries working in the interior. 1844–1865. London: Pall Mall Stamp Co. for Robson Lowe, 1981 ISBN 0-85397-240-0, 20p.
- The Oswald Schroeder Forgeries. London: Pall Mall Stamp Co. for Robson Lowe, 1981 ISBN 0-85397-183-8, 16p. A study of this little known forger.
- Iraq: The Influence of Bradbury, Wilkinson & Co. Ltd. on the postage, official and revenue stamps. London: R. Lowe, 1984 ISBN 0-85397-383-0, 21p.
- The Die Proofs of Waterlow & Sons: Pt.1, Great Britain & the Empire to 1960. Co-Author: Colin Fraser. London: Christie's Robson Lowe, c1985 ISBN 0-85397-417-9, 120p.
- The De La Rue Punch Book. London: The Royal Philatelic Society, 1987. 23p.
- The Knights of Malta, The Lazara Correspondence. London: Pall Mall Stamp Co., 1987 ISBN 0-85397-425-X, 32p. (1789–1797 period, the French Revolution).
- The Inland Posts (1392–1672), London: Christie's Robson Lowe, 1987. 333p.
- Historical Letters to Gratious Street, London 1570 – 1601. London: Christie's Robson Lowe, 1988. 40p.
- The Watson Postcards. London: Pall Mall Stamps for Christies Robson Lowe, 1990 ISBN 0-85397-433-0, 24p.
- The Oneglia Engraved Forgeries Commonly Attributed to Angelo Panelli. Co-Author: Carl Walske. Limassol: James Bendon, 1996 ISBN 9963-579-73-6, 100p.
- The Work of Jean de Sperati II: including previously unlisted forgeries. Co-Author: Carl Walske. London: Royal Philatelic Society, 2001 ISBN 0-900631-51-1, 218p.

== See also ==
- List of philatelists
