= Philip Spiro =

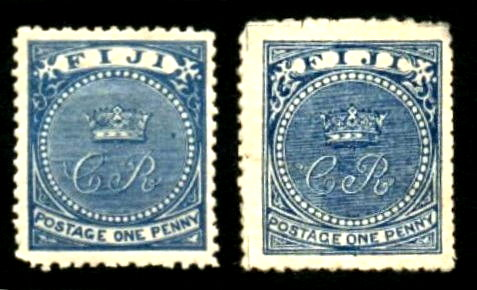
A genuine 1871 1d CR stamp of Fiji on the left with a forgery attributed to Philip Spiro on the right.

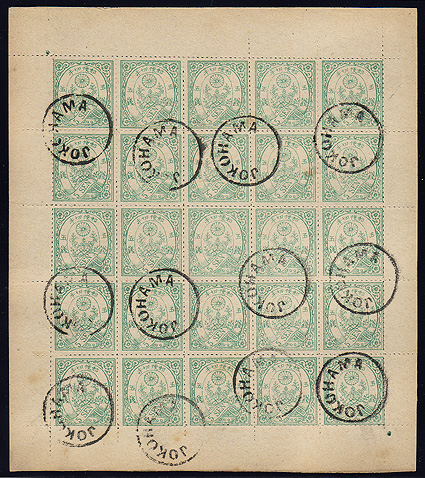
A sheet of Spiro forgeries of the Japanese 1872-75 Cherry Blossom stamps; includes forged cancels.

Philip Spiro was the head of the German printing firm of Spiro Brothers of Hamburg who from 1864 to about 1880 produced around 500 different lithographed reproductions of postage stamps.

The reproductions are not believed to have been intended to deceive, but they were so well done and so numerous that they contributed to a backlash against stamp forgery that was reflected in the publication of The Spud Papers; Or, Notes on Philatelic Weeds by the Rev. Robert Earée.

The forgeries were often produced in small sheets of 25, which are still sometimes found complete. Many old stamp collections include Spiro forgeries due to their wide distribution and a greater acceptance of forgeries as "space fillers" before 1900.

== See also ==
- List of stamp forgers
- Philatelic fakes and forgeries
