= Peter Winter (philately) =

German stamp forger

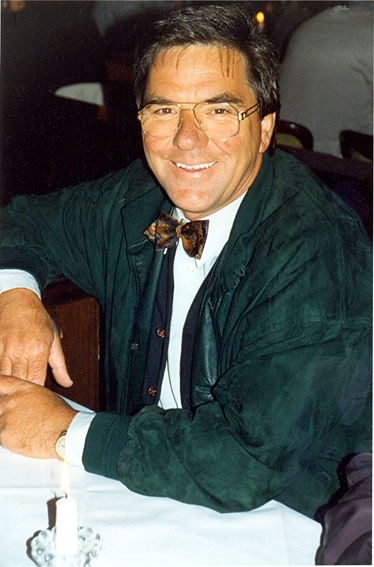
Peter Winter

Peter Winter (c. 1941 – c. 2018) was a German-born stamp reproducer. He also trained as an opera singer.

== The "reproductions" ==
In the early 1980s he offered "50 of the most valuable and significant stamps, authentically reproduced" and indicated that in order to reproduce these stamps as authentically as possible, he had refrained from marking them as reproductions. They were produced under the company label "Bruyère".

In or after 1985 he released rare stamps of various countries through "ProPhil Forum P.O.C." (Process Optimation Computersystems). Subsequently there were the reproductions of "Edition '85", then "Edition 88", the later offered by the Swiss "House of Stamps". A special was the offering of the four of the most famous stamps of the world, the Mauritius "Post Office", the Penny Black, the Baden 9 Kreuzer error and the British Guiana 1c magenta for 249 DM.

The stamps were offered as reproductions by Winter, but their lack of permanent identification made them easy objects of fraudulent activities targeted at unsuspecting collectors. Specialists may detect abnormal paper, indentations, lack of watermarks and other signs incongruent with authenticity.

Winter has never indicated that his stamps are genuine, they were sold as reproductions. However, his marks (such as "Faux", "Reprint", "Copy") can often be easily removed. Thus, Heiner Faber, a seller of stamps from Bonn, was convicted for having removed the marks and sold them as originals.

Winter produced stamps that if real might be catalogued at $20 million. His offer to sell his stamps to the APS for $1 million and stop producing reproductions was declined.

== See also ==
- List of stamp forgers
