= Turner Collection of Forgeries =

The Turner Collection of Forgeries is a collection of forgeries of postage stamps of the world to about 1900 that forms part of the British Library Philatelic Collections. It was formed by S.R. Turner and donated in 1973. It is held in five numbered boxes and contains a few genuine stamps for comparison.

== See also ==
- Philatelic fakes and forgeries
