= Lucian Smeets =

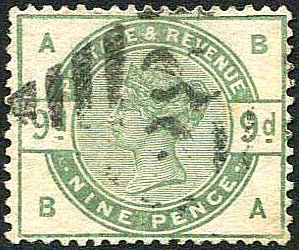
A British 9d stamp possibly forged by Smeets.

Dr. Lucian Smeets was a Belgian stamp forger operating around the early 1900s.

Smeets used a sophisticated method of taking an original stamp with the correct perforations, paper and watermark for the one he wished to forge, fading out the printing and then printing a new design of the desired stamp on the blank.

Among the stamps Smeets is believed to have forged are:

- British Solomon Islands Protectorate canoe stamps.
- British Victorian stamps.
- Nevis.
- Serbian stamps of 1901 and 1904.
