= Jean de Sperati =

Italian stamp forger (1884–1957)

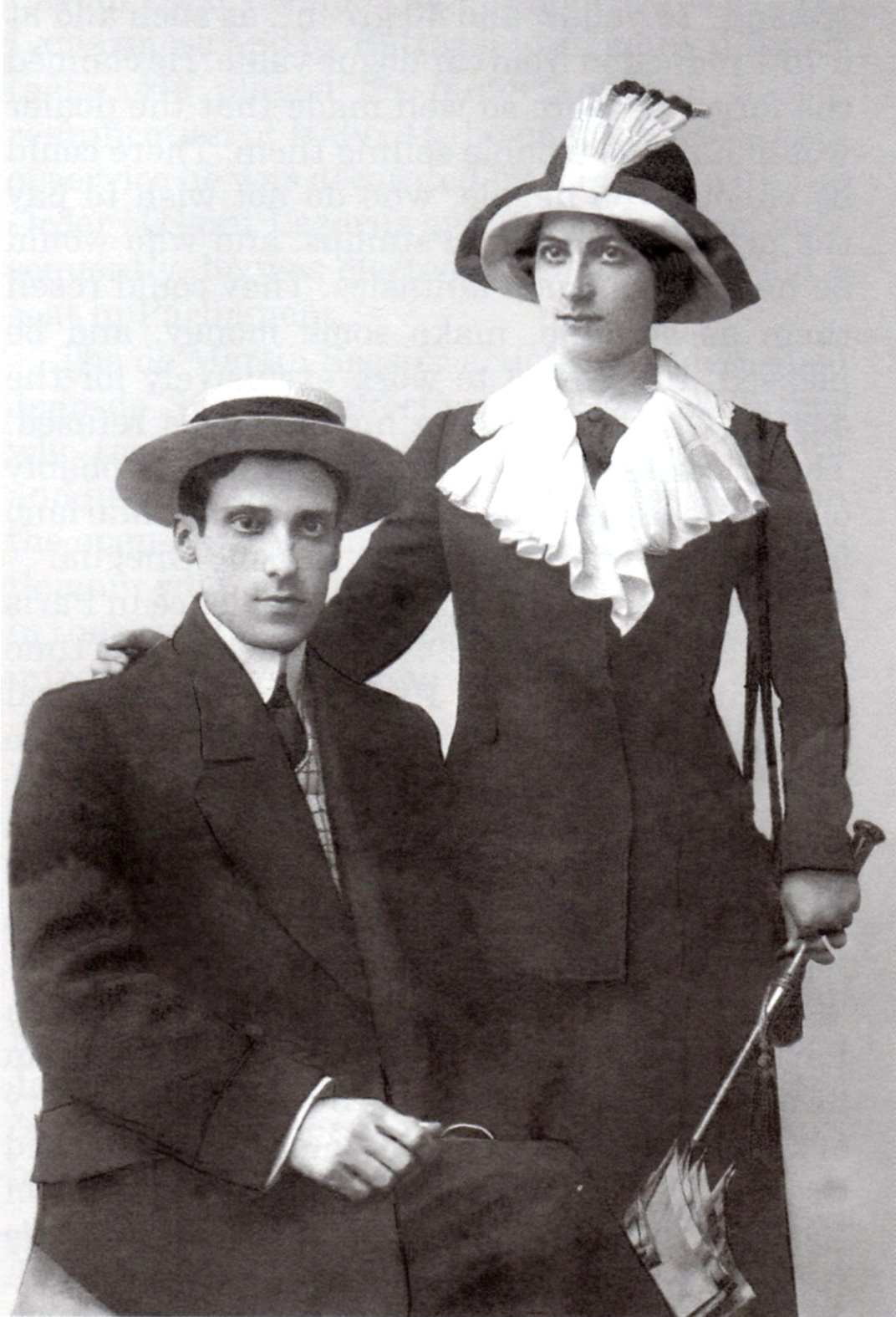
de Sperati and Marie Louise Corne. They were married on 1 August 1914. (Source: Family archive)

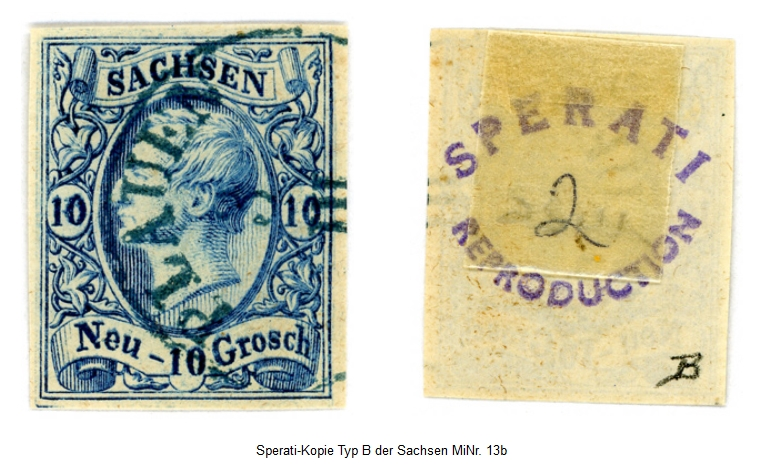
A Sperati forgery of an 1856 stamp of Saxony.

Jean de Sperati (14 October 1884 – 28 April 1957) was an Italian stamp forger. Robson Lowe considered him an artist and even professional stamp authenticators of his time attested to the genuineness of his work. Sperati created what he called a Livre d'Or which he boasted of in his autobiography and which contained 239 favourable opinions as to the genuineness of his forgeries from numerous experts, including Dr. Edward Diena and the Royal Philatelic Society London.

== Early life ==
Born Giovanni Desperati in 1884 in Pistoia, Italy, he fled to France in 1909, where he registered under the name Jean de Sperati, although he retained his Italian passport throughout his life and always considered himself an Italian. As a child in Pistoia and later in France, Sperati began to collect stamps. He was particularly interested in printing techniques, as well as photography which was in its infancy at that time. Relatives owned a postcard factory as well as a paper mill. Through this, Sperati was able to obtain copious knowledge of photographic processes, print technology and chemicals. These formed the basis for his eventual career as a stamp counterfeiter.

== The first forgeries ==
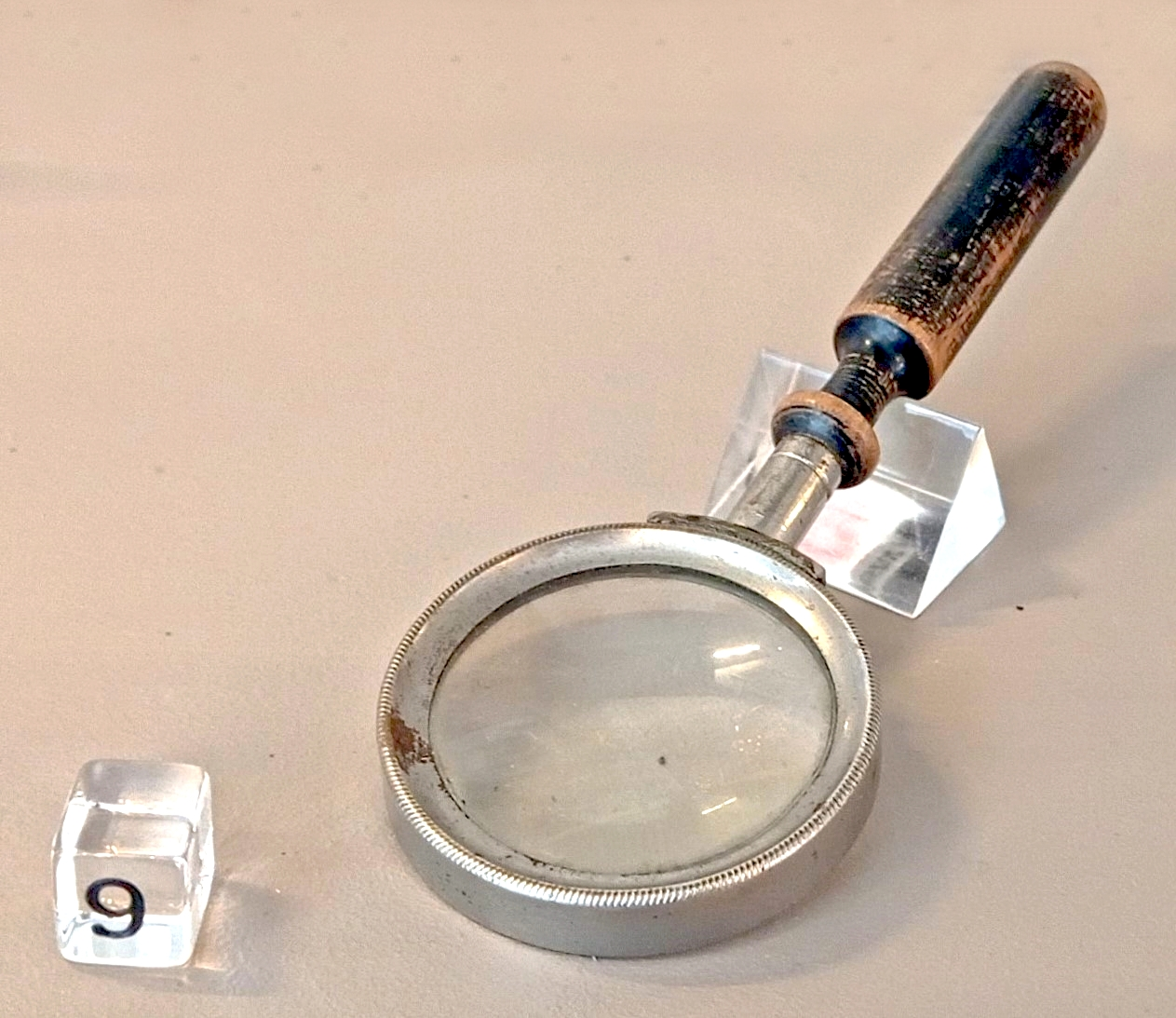
Jean de Sperati's magnifying glass on display at the Royal Philatelic Society London

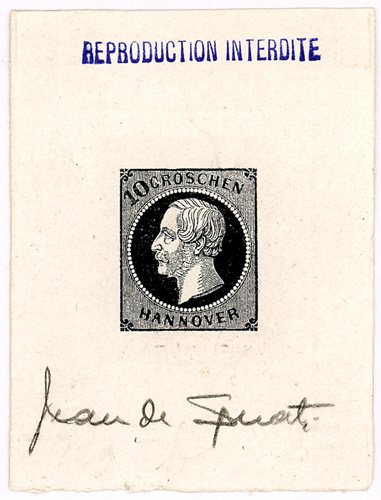
An undated work of Jean de Sperati. Probably a proof.

Sperati's first forgeries were of valuable stamps from San Marino, and stamp experts believed them to be genuine. Thereafter, he produced numerous reproductions of valuable stamps from all over the world. This eventually resulted in well over 500 master-quality forgeries from more than 100 different stamp-issuing agencies.

In 1942, for the first time in his life, Sperati came into conflict with the law. A shipment marked as valuable from Sperati to a stamp dealer in Lisbon, Portugal, was intercepted by French customs. It contained several forged German stamps. They charged him with "exporting capital" without a licence and trying to avoid customs payments. He protested his innocence, and explained to the police that it contained only copies of valuable stamps, which he himself had prepared, whereupon the police called in the country's best stamp experts to clear up the facts of the case. These experts came to the judgment that the stamps in question were all originals, and very valuable ones at that. Sperati still managed to convince the police that they were forgeries, and was therefore charged with fraud. His trial took place in April 1948.

== The 1948 trial ==
To explain, Sperati tried to convince the court that he had no deceitful intentions in the sale of the stamps. He considered himself to be an artist and not a counterfeiter. Furthermore, he declared to the court that he had merely forgotten to clearly mark the stamps as forgeries and he promised to be more diligent about such marking in the future. He claimed that he had offered the forgeries of rare stamps at about 1% of the normal market price in order to assist the simple collector to obtain these rarities. Nevertheless, the Paris judiciary convicted Sperati and sentenced him to a year in prison, 10,000 francs fine and an additional 300,000 francs for criminal intentions. The Paris judiciary did not convict him on the basis of the imitation, but rather because of Sperati's "deceitful intentions". He was convicted in April 1948.

== After the guilty verdict ==
Sperati did not have to serve his prison sentence, on the grounds of his age – he was already over 64 years old. In 1954 he sold all his remaining forgeries as well as all the clichés to the "British Philatelic Association." He then withdrew from the forgery business and promised never again to forge a stamp. His motive in selling the tools of his trade to the "British Philatelic Association" was to prevent them falling into the possession of someone who would imitate his work. Sperati died three years later in Aix-les-Bains at the age of 73.

== His life's work ==
Sperati created forgeries of the 10-cent black, one of the first (1847) United States postal issues. It is possible to identify these forgeries by two small flaws. Many Sperati forgeries remain undetected. Sperati forged the most valuable rarities of the stamp world. Sperati's forgeries are sold at high prices, as some see them as rare collector's items. Sperati paid great attention to the accuracy of the postmark when forging the stamps. Therefore, postmarks found on his forgeries are limited to those of larger cities. Sperati's forgeries are currently valuable in the philatelic market. He probably produced more than 5,000 forgeries.

== See also ==
- Erasmo Oneglia
- List of stamp forgers
- Philatelic fakes and forgeries
