= Harold Treherne =

English stamp forger

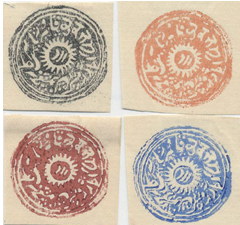
"Brighton forgeries" of the stamps of Jammu and Kashmir produced by Harold Treherne.

Harold Treherne (c. 1884 – after 1908) of Brighton, England was a stamp forger notable for his forgeries of the stamps of India and Australia who was known as The Brighton forger and his works as Brighton forgeries.

== First forgeries ==
Treherne appears to have entered the forgery business about 1902 or slightly earlier when he was working as a clerk in Brighton. He would have been aged about 18 in 1902.

Treherne at first produced only fake overprints and surcharges, or imperforate whole stamps as he lacked perforating or rouletting equipment and the overprints and surcharges only required simple printing in black ink. Later he moved on to more sophisticated forgeries.

The Excelsior Traders' Supply Company in London supplied Treherne with a large number of zinc cliches and printing plates including overprints, surcharges and complete stamps.

Treherne also had a contact in India, a Mr Thomas Hill in Bombay, who supplied him with genuine used Indian stamps to which fake overprints were applied and which were returned in lots of 1000 of a kind for sale in India.

== Later forgeries ==
Some of Treherene's best work is thought to be forgeries of the stamps of Jammu and Kashmir which he produced in whole sheets showing all of the varieties of type on the originals.

== Aliases ==
Treherne used the aliases G. Arnold, H. Curtis, H. Hordern, M. Melville, J. or T. Morton, R. Newman, A. West and possibly others.

== Trapped ==
Treherne's work started to be noticed in 1903 and 1904 but it was not at first attributed to him. In 1903 A.B. Kay wrote about forged stamps of Kashmir in Stanley Gibbons' Monthly Journal and in 1904 Charles Nissen wrote more generally in The Stamp Collectors' Annual about the wide variety of forgeries for sale in Brighton.

In 1907 a member of the Stamp Trade Protection Association became concerned about the volume of orders for common stamps received from Treherne that could be easily manipulated by the application of fake surcharges or overprints. After a member received an order for a large number of Great Britain penny reds, the association set a trap for Treherne by marking some with a pin prick. When the stamps were eventually sold, they had acquired a CYPRUS overprint not present originally, thus greatly increasing their value.

Teherne was arrested on 2 August 1907 , and authorities discovered 447 dies or printing plates in his possession. He pleaded guilty at trial, though sentencing was initially deferred.

Meanwhile, the Commissioners of Inland Revenue brought further charges against him for possessing dies, plates, and instruments intended for producing counterfeit stamps. He was convicted on these additional charges and fined £15 plus court costs.

In January 1908, the earlier case in which sentencing had been postponed was reopened, and Treherne received a sentence of four months of hard labour, along with an extra month for failing to pay the previous fine.

== See also ==
- Philatelic fakes and forgeries
