= Erasmo Oneglia =

Italian printer

Erasmo Oneglia (1853–1934) was an Italian printer born in Turin who was a successful stamp forger in the 1890s and early 1900s.

Oneglia's first forgeries are believed to have been of the Newfoundland early stamps, and they are included in the second edition of Robert Brisco Earee's Album Weeds in 1892.

In 1897, he was arrested in London for trying to sell forgeries to the stamp dealers Stanley Gibbons; however, he was let off with a fine of just 20 shillings and his stock confiscated.

Oneglia was closely associated with other Italian forgers of the period, such as Angelo Panelli, and the brothers Mariano and Jean de Sperati, who worked in Turin for a while and probably with Oneglia.

== See also ==
- List of stamp forgers
- Philatelic fakes and forgeries
