= Angelo Panelli =

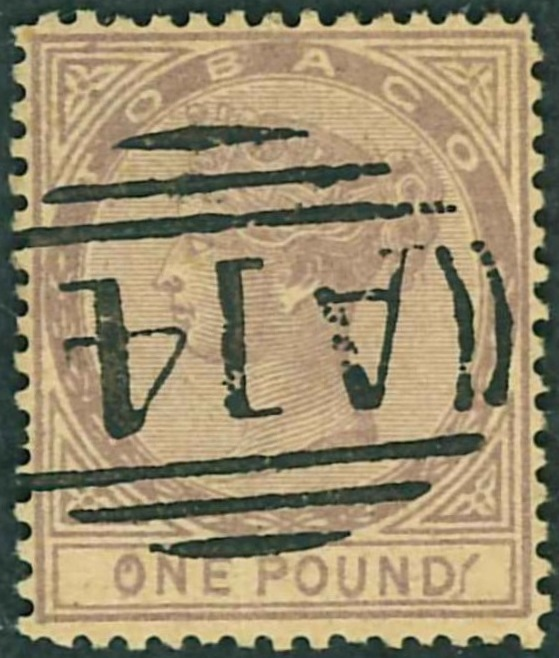
Example forgery

Angelo Panelli (c. 1887 – c. 1967) was an Italian stamp forger, operating from Sanremo in the 1920s and 1930s.

Panelli was closely associated with other Italian forgers of the period, particularly Erasmo Oneglia.

== See also ==
- List of stamp forgers
- Philatelic fakes and forgeries
