= Philatelic fakes and forgeries =

Fraudulently manufactured imitation postage stamps

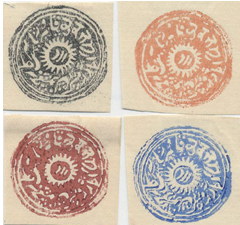
"Brighton forgeries" of the stamps of Jammu and Kashmir produced by Harold Treherne

In general, philatelic fakes and forgeries are labels that look like postage stamps but have been produced to deceive or defraud. Learning to identify these can be a challenging branch of philately.

To a large extent the definitions below are consistent with those given in the introduction to various recent editions of the Scott Standard Postage Stamp Catalogue. "We use the term 'forgery' to indicate stamps produced to defraud collectors (properly known as forgeries) and to defraud stamp-issuing governments (properly known as counterfeits). 'Fake' is used to indicate the alteration of a genuine stamp to make it appear as something else. Fakes might refer to cancellations, overprints, added or clipped perforations, stamp design alterations, etc." While difficult to do today, one famous case is the Stock Exchange forgery of 1872.

Questions are often raised about when a stamp is legitimately produced for postage. Matthew Karanian has proposed the following guideline:

Stamps are legitimate if they are recognized internationally in practice, even if they are not recognized expressly, as by a treaty or international agreement. This is the same principle of international law that applies to the recognition of nation-states. A nation becomes a nation-state when the international community begins treating it as such. For Karabagh which is not a member of the UPU but which does get its mail delivered, this demonstrate that the stamps it issues are neither propaganda labels nor part of a money-making scam.

== History of philatelic fakes and forgeries ==
The first postage stamp was issued in Great Britain in 1840 and, by the early 1860s, the first postage stamp forgery—in the sense of a stamp created to fool philatelists into thinking that it is a genuine one—appeared on the market. By 1863, forgeries were so common that Thornton Lewes and Edward Pemberton published the book Forged Stamps: How to Detect Them. By 1864, forgeries were being produced of both common and scarce stamps from a wide range of issuing countries such as Austria, British Guiana, Finland, India, and Spain.

Jean de Sperati is among the master forgers in the history of philately. He created forgeries of the 10-cent black, one of the first United States postal issues, in 1847. It is possible to identify these forgeries by two small flaws. The Vancouver Island forgery refers to a stamp that was originally issued in 1865. To produce his forgery, de Sperati bleached a real, cheaper stamp of the same vintage. He then used a process called photolithography to make an almost perfect copy of the stamp. In his lifetime, Jean de Sperati forged over 500 stamps. He sometimes signed his work in pencil on the back. His forged stamps are now often worth more than the originals.

== Classification ==
Stamp-like objects, not all of which are really fakes and forgeries, are described below for the sake of developing a better understanding of such claims.

=== Postal forgeries or counterfeits ===
Those who produce counterfeits appeal to a very different market from philatelists. They depend on their stamps being produced in large quantities in order to be able to recover their outlay. The person who would use them must feel that he or she can purchase them for a price that is significantly lower than the price at a legitimate post office, or is perhaps duped into thinking they are genuine. This makes the most common current stamp used for everyday mailing a prime target for counterfeiting activity.

The earliest commercial forgeries are all postal, and the Penny Black was the first stamp to be copied in 1840, its first year. Partial forgery consists of changing colors or changing the face values of stamps to imitate a higher value stamp. Other tricks consisted of methods to make the cancellation disappear (chemically erasing, placing a second stamp on it if it just hits a corner). The Spanish Post Office changed its stamps almost annually between 1850 and 1879 to stay ahead of the forgers.

Notable postal forgeries include:

- France: 20c (1870), 15c (1886), sower 25c (1923)
- Germany: 10pf (1902), 10pf (1909)
- Great Britain: 1s (1872), 4d World Cup Winners (1966)
- Australia: 2d Sydney Harbour Bridge (1932)
- USA: 2c Washington (1894), 13c Liberty Bell (1980)

As a curiosity postal authorities have published their own forgeries, thus the British Post Office forged its own 1d stamps in 1856 to see if its features were fraud-proof.

==== Protective measures ====
Postal services developed, early on, measures to protect the integrity of their stamps. Some of these steps are similar to those used to protect against forged currency. Major steps include:

- Watermarks
- Special paper
- Delicate engraving
- Printing methods
- Special ink for postmarks
- Insertion of silk threads
- Secret marks either visible or invisible to the microscope
- Re-issue of stamps

It may not be possible to distinguish between a philatelic and postal forgery if the stamps are unused, merely by looking at them; the techniques utilized in producing them are identical. However, if the stamps bear cancellations, they may be more readily distinguished. If a stamp has a forged cancellation, it necessarily is a philatelic forgery since it was obviously made for sale to collectors, not to be used to send a letter. If the cancellation is genuine, it is likely, but not necessarily, a postal forgery, since sometimes forgers have used genuine cancellation devices to "cancel" forged stamps. A helpful distinction may be to have one of these stamps on an envelope that actually went through the mail, but that too requires caution. Counterfeits that reach the philatelic community are fairly scarce, and that alone makes them more valuable.

=== Philatelic forgeries ===
Soon after their introduction, stamps became philatelic objects, and stamp forgery to the detriment of the collector became a problem. The first book about the topic was written by Jean-Baptiste Moens from Belgium De la falsifications des timbres-poste in 1862. Shortly thereafter Thornton Lewes and Edward Pemberton published Forged Stamps: How to detect them and Robert Brisco Earée published Album Weeds; or, How to Detect Forged Stamps. Stamps produced by famous forgers have become collectibles, as well.

Unlike counterfeits these are very common in collections. Many that were produced in the earliest days of stamp collecting in the 19th century are still plentiful. At that time many considered it quite acceptable to fill a space in an album with a facsimile when the genuine stamp was unavailable. Later, especially in the late nineteenth and early twentieth century, massive numbers of stamps were forged for the packet trade, including very common as well as rare stamps, so that the fact that a stamp is common is no guarantee that it is not a philatelic forgery.

==== Fakes ====
Fakes begin with a genuine stamp, which is altered in some way to make it more valuable to stamp collectors. When catalogues show different varieties with significantly different values this can be great motivation to alter the cheap example into something that can be sold for great profit. Sometimes only minor changes can affect the apparent valuation of a stamp.

Knowledge is an important tool in helping to detect fakes and forgeries. A person who is able to identify some of the most obvious forgeries can save a lot of money in expertising fees, though the information may not yet be enough to establish that a stamp is genuine. Earee's Album Weeds, and Fernand Serrane's Vade Mecum are only two books in the vast literature about stamp forgeries.

==== Expertising stamps as protection ====
As an expert can falsify stamps often quite easily, it is advisable particularly when dealing with stamps of value to have them examined and expertised. Such experts are highly specialized and generally focused on a selected philatelic area. Falsified stamps may be marked as such, while a genuine stamp of value should receive a certificate of authenticity by a reputable authority.

In recent years, homemade forgeries can easily reach the market through the Internet.

=== Government and propaganda forgeries ===
Political and propaganda forgery is produced by countries in conflict to hurt the opponent. Stamps may be issued to deprive the enemy of revenue, to distribute propaganda material, to cause confusion, and to depict propaganda messages. Propaganda stamps are very collectable and have been philatelically forged: a forgery of a forgery. Many propaganda stamps would have been difficult to circulate in the postal system because they would have been immediately removed, thus used propaganda stamps are unusual (but easily falsified).

==== World War I ====
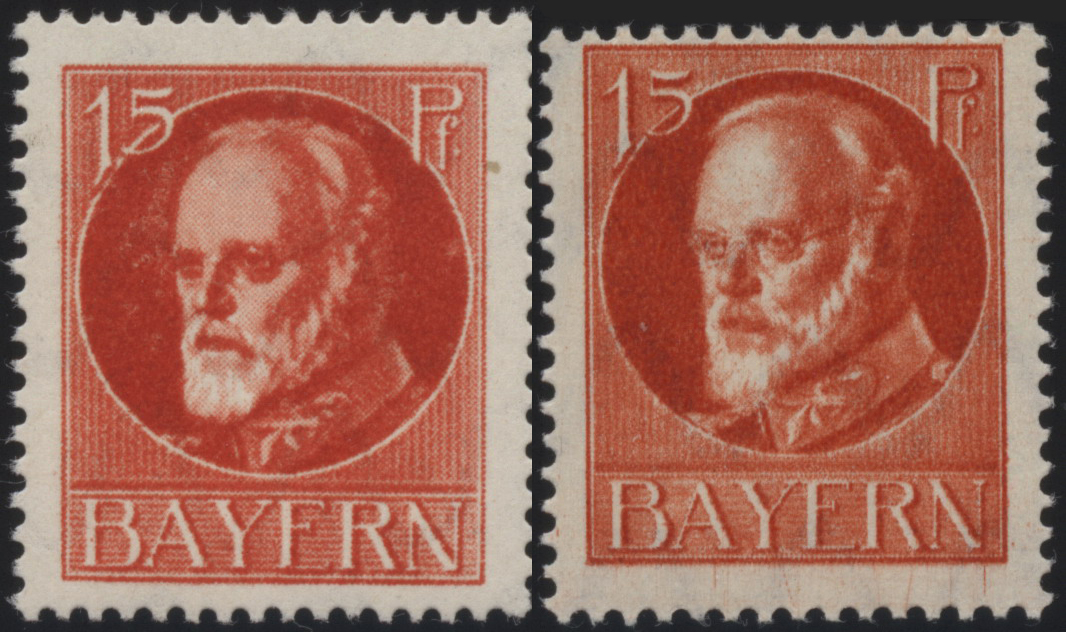
War mail forgery Ludwig III. (left). On the right the original.

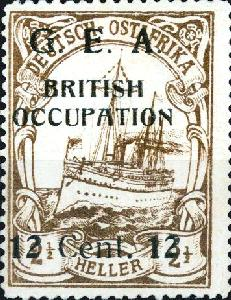
Propaganda forgery Deutsch-Ostafrika

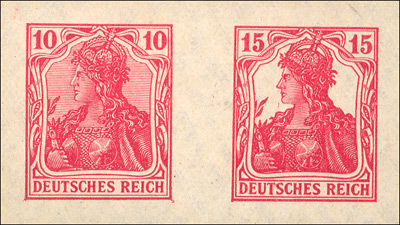
Probes of the British "Germania"-forgery, connected to 10 and 15 pfennigs

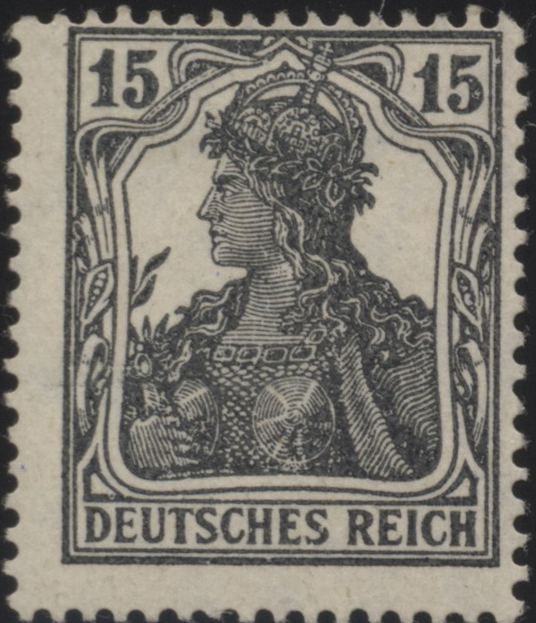
"Germania"-forgery, 15 Pf. in correct colour

During the First World War, German postage stamps were forged by Great Britain. Virtually all counterfeit stamps are forgeries for espionage.

The values of 5, 10 and 15 pfennigs of the then Bavarian postage stamp issue with the portrait of Ludwig III fell victim to war mail forgeries. However, only unused pieces are known. Imperforated proofs were also discovered among these forgeries. The war fakes differ in drawing and paper from the original stamps.

The second German postage stamp issue was forged by Great Britain on behalf of the Dutch Propaganda Office. It was used to frank leaflets and brochures in German language. Affected are the postage stamp values of 10 and 15 pfennigs of the Germania edition of the German Reich. The drawing deviates from the originals, as does the watermark, which is too thin, and the chalky white paper. Unlike the previous war mail forgeries, there are also pieces with real postmarks from both forged stamps.

There is also known a type of propaganda forgery, which was produced between 1914 and 1918. Forgeries of German East Africa stamps were produced, which showed the imprint "G. E. A. BRITISH OCCUPATION" and a new value in cents. The five forged issues were about twice the size of the original stamps, presumably to show the overprint in larger letters. The stamps were apparently intended to put the massive German resistance in the colony of Deutsch-Ostafrika into perspective and to propagate an early occupation of the whole area.

On December 12, 1914, two Germania stamps were reproduced in the French newspaper "Le Matin". A red 10 pfennig stamp bore the imprint "Schweiz 10 Centimes", a blue 20 pfennig stamp the imprint "Schweiz 25 Centimes". The article stated that there are more Germania stamps with various other values. This was obviously intended to give the impression that neutral Switzerland was on the verge of being occupied by Germany. The German embassy in Bern felt compelled to deny the article and accuse the newspaper of having fallen for a forgery, which, according to subsequent evidence, was without doubt the case.

Shortly before the end of World War I, war mail forgeries of the values of 5, 10, and 25 Heller of the then-current postage stamp issue of Austria were produced in England. The stamps show the Austrian imperial crown and Emperor Karl. The fake postage stamps were printed on slightly more yellowish paper than the originals. Furthermore, the stamp images of the forgeries are slightly higher (0.25 – 0.5 mm). Used war mail forgeries have not yet been found; however, there are mint pieces of all three values as well as proofs of the 10-Hellers value in small sheet format in three different colours with the date September 25, 1918.

==== World War II ====
===== German forgeries for the United Kingdom =====
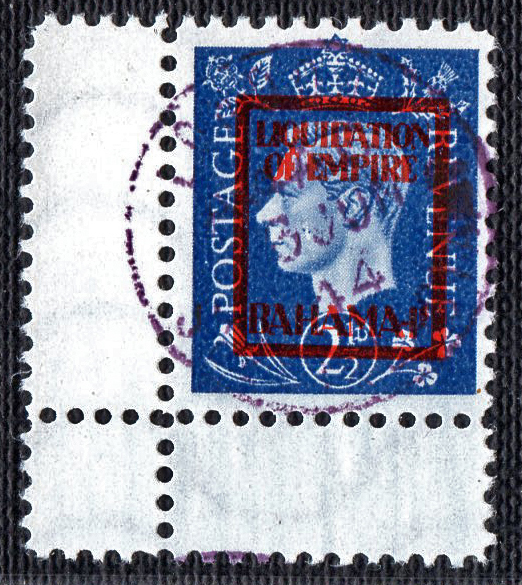
Propaganda stamp with the head of King George VI. Version with red overprint: "Liquidation of Empire/BAHAMA-Is". Additionally with false cancellation: "LONDON AAAO/-6JUN/44/SPECIAL-STAMP".

All known German falsifications are propaganda forgeries. Forgeries of the Silver Jubilee issue of 1935 were falsified at the Sachsenhausen concentration camp by order of Heinrich Himmler during the war. The modifications included the insertion of Jewish and communist emblems, placement of Joseph Stalin's head in place of King George's, the inscription that was faulty ("This war is a Jewsh war" [sic]) and the years altered to 1939-1944. A similar falsification concerned the coronation issue from 1937 in which Stalin's head appears in the place of the Queen's, the Star of David is present, as well as an inscription concerning the Tehran Conference. A third forgery is different and affects the 1937 series with the head of King George VI. The alterations are very subtle affecting emblems. Six values of the series were falsified. In the short film "Adolph Burger's Historical Artifacts" Sachsenhausen survivor Burger shows examples of some of these stamps that he helped produce. He also describes this in greater detail in his book The Devil's Workshop.

===== United States forgeries for Germany =====
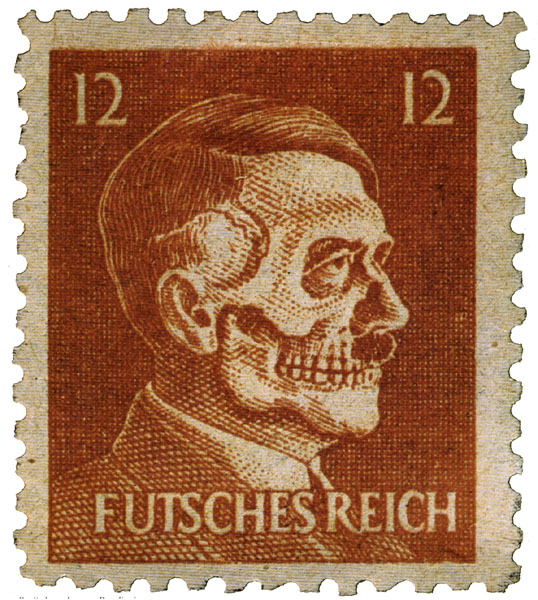
American propaganda stamp

The first stamps to be forged were the common 6 and 12 pfennig Hitler head stamps. The forgeries were printed in Rome by the Office of Strategic Services in 1944. These stamps were applied to letters containing propaganda, marked with false postmarks (Wien 8, Wien 40, Hannover 1), and distributed by drops from airplanes as Operation Cornflakes.

The US modified the 12 pfennig Hitler head stamp by the insertion of a death head and the inscription Futsches Reich ("ruined Reich") replaces Deutsches Reich. Similarly, the Hitler block from 1937 was altered to show a death head, graves and gallows; the inscription is Deutsches Reich 1944. Postcards were also forged.

===== Soviet forgeries for Germany =====
Soviet forgeries were limited to postcards with propaganda messages that had imprinted stamps.

===== British forgeries =====
Great Britain produced forgeries for Germany, France, Italy, Poland (Generalgouvernement) and French Morocco during World War II.

Regarding Germany, the first forgery was the 12 pfennig Hindenburg head stamp, later followed by the 3, 4, 6 and 8 pfennig values, to distribute propaganda material in Germany. Other stamps such as the Hitler heads and some field post stamps may not have reached circulation.

A major effort was the production of propaganda stamps. The Hitler head stamp was modified to depict Heinrich Himmler.

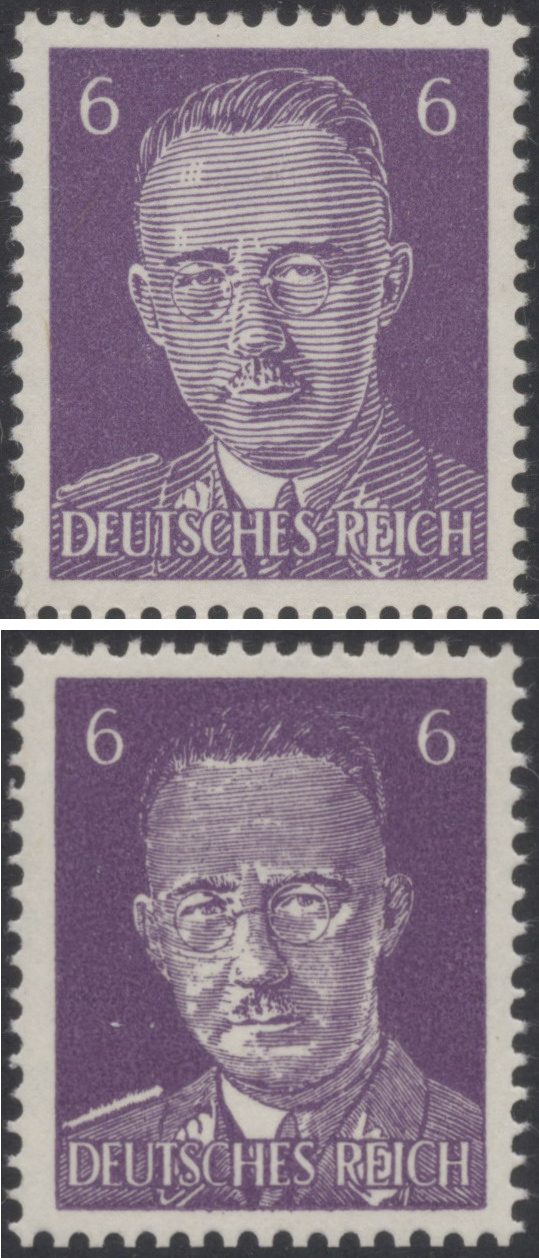
Himmler-Forgery (Type I top, Type II bottom)

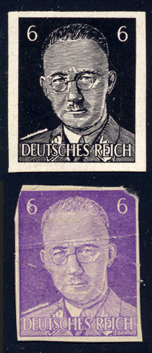
Proofs of the Himmler-Forgery Type II in black and violet

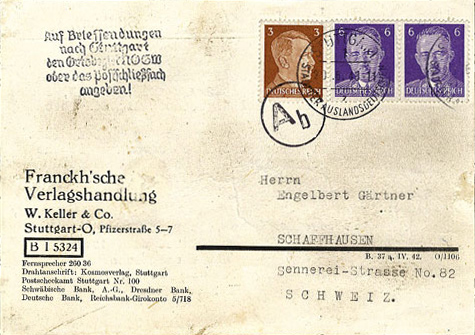
Cancelled Himmler stamps forged by PWE on a postcard

The Himmler stamp was designed by the British secret service with the intention of driving a wedge between the leadership of the Nazi regime. With the idea that Himmler was planning a coup d'état and wanted to make himself a new leader or president of Germany, an allegedly prepared stamp issue with his portrait was considered suitable to bring this idea into the minds of the NS leadership in the first place. The stamp was distributed by British agents, especially in neutral Switzerland. It was hoped that stamp collectors became aware of this stamp and that a major press campaign would subsequently take place about it. It turned out, however, that this forgery did not attract a lot of attention, neither in Switzerland nor in the rest of Europe. In the end, the British agents were forced to take the Himmler stamp directly to stamp dealers to make it public. However, even this measure did not lead to the desired success and the action turned out to be a complete failure, as practically nobody believed in the alleged Himmler overthrow. However, a member of the US secret service OSS in Bern ascribed extraordinary significance to this stamp. On June 10, 1944, US agent Allen Dulles prepared a detailed report for his superior in Washington in which he described the mysterious stamp. As the US had not been informed about the counterfeiting operation by the British secret service, the US secret service started superfluous investigations and thus tied up personnel, which finally turned the whole operation into an embarrassing mishap. The Jewish concentration camp inmate Adolf Burger, who had participated in Operation Bernhard, commented after the war that Heinrich Himmler was very indignant about this British forgery with his portrait. This apparently prompted him to repay with the same coin and also to commission mocking propaganda stamps on the British side.

There are two distinctly different versions of the Himmler stamp, one with wide lines, a second type with narrow lines; there are imperforated proofs of the second type in both violet and black, and of the first type in violet. No genuine cancellations have yet been found; all known specimens are clearly forgeries to the collectors' detriment. However, some postcards and envelopes were made by the British secret service PWE, which were prepared with attached Himmler stamps and faked German cancellations. These were intended for neutral countries such as Switzerland, Sweden, or probably also Portugal to be distributed there by agents. Some of these postal items have been preserved.

Another propaganda forgery concerns the 1943 Hitler putsch stamp that shows General Witzleben (a participant in the July 20, 1944 Hitler assassination attempt) and is inscribed Gehängt am 8. August 1944 ("Hanged on...") Other forgeries were based on the welfare stamps from 1938, and the 1944 Hitler putsch stamp.

Regarding France, Britain produced forgeries of the Iris series and of stamps depicting Marshal Philippe Pétain.

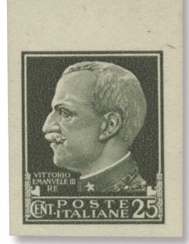
Emanuel-forgery

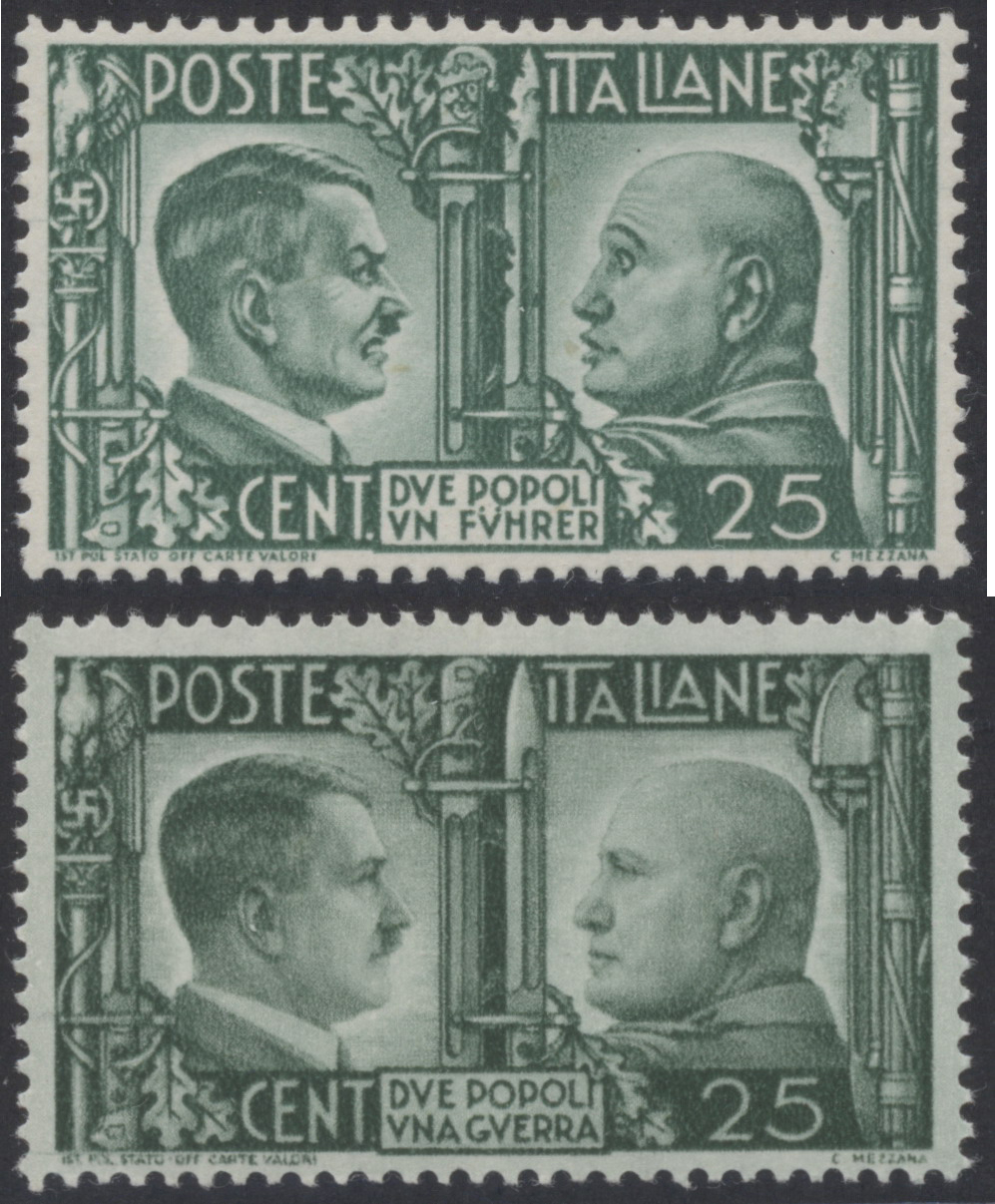
Propaganda forgery of Michel Nr. 625 (Italy) (top). The original stamp is at the bottom.

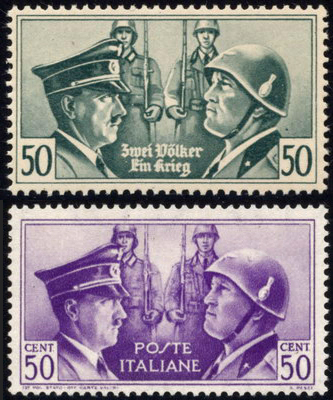
Propaganda forgery of Michel Nr. 626 (Italy) (top). The original stamp is at the bottom.

Propaganda forgeries were also produced for Italy, which was allied with Germany in the Second World War. Thus the design of Michel No. 625 (Italy) was changed by disfiguring the heads of Hitler respectively Mussolini in a caricature-like manner, so that the impression was created to contrast an "aggressive and grim" looking Hitler with a "baffled and intimidated" looking Mussolini. The Italian text was changed from (translated) "Two peoples, one war" to "Two peoples, one Führer", with the word Führer written in German. Also, in the right-hand "Italian part", the cutting and stabbing weapons were depicted heavily worn or damaged. In the left "German part" the sword hilt received the small caricature of a head or face. More subtle was the characterization of German dominance over Italy in the propaganda forgery Michel No. 626 (Italy), 50 Centesimi. The stamp, which was originally issued in a violet shade, was printed in green. The text was changed from "Poste Italiane" to "Two Peoples/One War". Both forgeries were probably produced in autumn 1943. The British Political Warfare Executive (PWE) also produced two propaganda booklets in Italian on which the Italian stamps are depicted. On one of the booklets Michel No. 626 (Italy) is shown, but in blue coloring instead of a violet tone. Probably already at the beginning of 1943 the PWE also produced a war forgery of the Italian stamp with the image of King Victor Emanuel III. It is assumed that this was intended to be used to frank the propaganda booklets "Neapolitan letters" from 1943. Both perforated and imperforated specimens of this stamp exist. The forgery differed from the original mainly by the perforation (14 ¾ : 14) instead of 14.

Stamps were produced in Great Britain for the Generalgouvernement and used by the Polish underground army to distribute propaganda material. The Hitler head stamp of the Generalgouvernement was modified to depict Hans Frank on the 20 groszy value. These stamps circulated in the postal system.

French-controlled Morocco received stamps forged by the British authorities that had overprints of Deutsche Reichspost in Marokko to create confusion and suggest an imminent German occupation. Few examples are known.

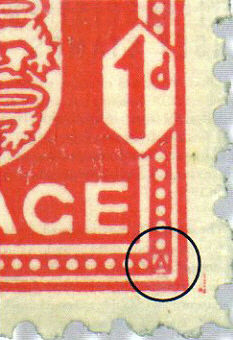
Inserted letter «A» on a 1 penny stamp

The propaganda forgeries of two stamps of the Channel Island Jersey may be regarded as a curiosity. Jersey, like the other Channel Islands, was occupied by the German Wehrmacht from 1940 to 1945. The British designer and engraver N.V.L. Rybot was commissioned by the German administration to design and print Jersey stamps. Apparently to his personal satisfaction, he engraved the very small and inconspicuous letters "AABB" and "AAAA" in the four corners of the half-penny and 1-penny stamps. After the war, Rybot explained that he had inserted the secret letters in order to strengthen the fighting spirit of the British, who were informed about the forgery. According to his statement, the letters "AABB" were to represent an abbreviation for the words "Adolphe Atrox" (Latin for "Cruel Adolf") and "Bloody Benito". Furthermore, the letters "AAAA" had the abbreviated meaning "Ad Avernum, Adolphe Atrox", Latin for "To hell, cruel Adolf".

==== Cold war: West Berlin for the GDR ====
Between 1948 and 1954 a group founded by Werner Hildebrandt produced anti-communist propaganda including stamps that were used in the postal system of East Germany (GDR). The first stamps to be modified were the 12 and 24 pfennig values of the series depicting the President of the GDR Wilhelm Pieck. The propaganda versions showed a noose and the inscription Undeutsche Undemokratische Diktatur ("un-German un-democratic dictatorship"). Other changes were made to the stamps of the Five Year Plan. The group also modified production instructions to factories that caused economic damage.

=== Other types ===
==== Official reprints ====
Official reprints of stamps that are no longer valid for postage are usually produced by governments to meet a philatelic demand. Scott numbers 3 and 4 of the United States were produced for this purpose. This also happened with several early sets of the People's Republic of China.

==== Remainders ====
Remainders are surplus stocks of legitimate postage stamps that are put on the philatelic market after ceasing to be valid for postal purposes. Among these are the later stamps of Nova Scotia, before it became a province of Canada, and the German inflationary period stamps. One effect of distributing large quantities of remaindered stamps to the public is that used stamps can be much more valuable than mint ones.

==== Bogus stamps ====
Bogus stamps are fictitious stamps which purport to be produced by an entity that exists and might have produced them, but did not. A bogus stamp is not a forgery because it is not based on any genuine stamp. It does not even resemble anything that the entity did produce, and only rarely are any of these labels ever shipped to the place that is shown as issuing them. The term also refers to a genuine stamp which bears the sham addition of an unauthorized surcharge or overprint.

They are generally issued to deceive collectors. Among these are the "issues" for South Moluccas when Henry Stolow printed the Maluku Selatan stamps, and for the uninhabited Scottish island of Staffa. The 1923 famine relief stamps of Azerbaijan were bogus, but these too were also subsequently forged.

==== Fantasies ====
Fantasies are stamps claimed to be issued by places that do not even exist. One of the most famous of these were "King" Charles-Marie David de Mayréna's stamps for Sedang. The stamps of New Atlantis required the construction of a bamboo raft that would be floated in the Atlantic as the country.

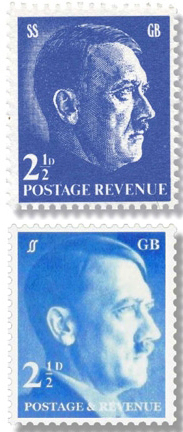
Hitler-fantasy: a genuine stamp on top and a fake stamp at the bottom

In exceptional cases, even fantasies can be highly traded in collector circles. Fantasy stamps from 1978, which were produced in Great Britain, represent an exceptional case. In that year the British author Len Deighton published a book entitled SS-GB. The story is about a Britain that was occupied by Nazi Germany during the Second World War. In this context, a stamp with Hitler's head and the inscription "Postage Revenue", as found on all British stamps, appeared on the front page of the book. As a clever marketing strategy for the introduction of the book, a booklet of stamps was produced, which contained the alleged Hitler stamps with three different values and in three different colours of six stamps each. However, the Royal Mail confiscated all the booklets it could get its hands on as rapidly as possible. The remaining booklets quickly became a rarity sought after by collectors. At an auction in England, for example, a booklet was sold for 300 British pounds. In Germany, in 1998, one of them realized the high price of 1250 DM. So it was not long before counterfeiters came up with the idea of forging even these booklets with fantasy stamps themselves. These imitations also brought in several hundred dollars on the US market.

==== Local stamps ====
Local stamps are usually intended to serve a local purpose, and are not necessarily fraudulent. Thus we have in relation to the Great Britain: "... there were two local entities that 'performed much in the way of postal service ... Herm and Lundy.' Those two, it would seem, are considered thoroughly legitimate." These islands did not have official post offices, and a private service needed to be established to transport mail to the mainland.

==== Cinderellas ====
Cinderellas is a broad term for just about anything that looks like a postage stamp but is not. While the term includes bogus stamps and fantasies, it also includes many fund raising labels, Christmas seals and other stickers that were produced for legitimate purposes.

== Methods ==
=== Entire forgeries ===
This is the most obvious way of producing forgeries. The forger starts from scratch, and engraves a completely new plate. It is virtually impossible to produce a new engraving that will be identical to the original. Thus, in the earliest set of Hong Kong stamps the forgeries can be distinguished by counting the number of shading lines in the background. Some early Japanese forgeries are distinguished by remembering that the chrysanthemum crest in the stamp should always have 16 petals.

Modern electronic techniques would appear to make things easier for the forger, but understanding how different printing methods work can be very helpful in discovering these forgeries. Peter Winter from Germany used modern technology to produce convincing reproductions which were then sold as genuine.

=== Forged overprints ===
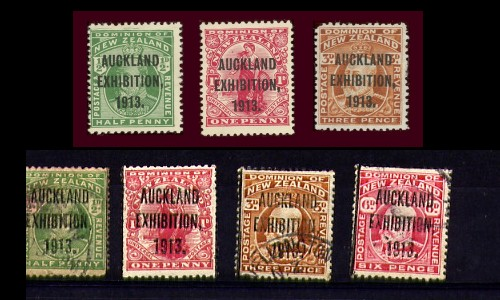
Forged overprints on 1913 New Zealand stamps

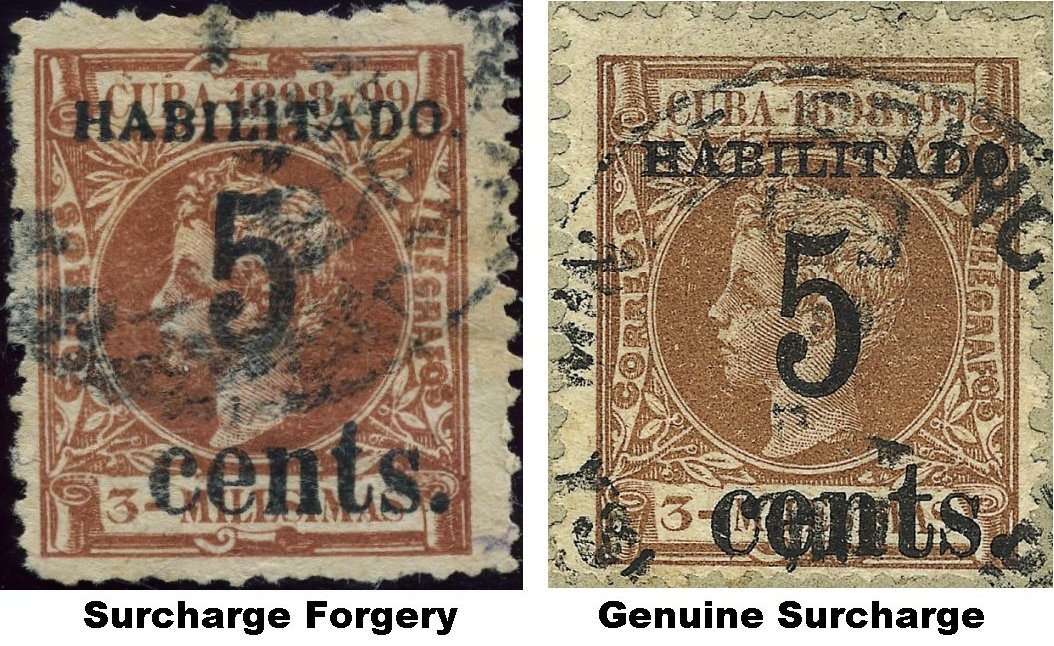
Forged overprint on 1899 Puerto Principe, Cuba, provisional stamp alongside a genuine surcharge. While the relative spacings of the three elements of the surcharge are roughly the same as on the genuine stamp, note, however, the differences in the crossbar on the "t" and the cap of the "5", together with the crispness of the lettering.

One would imagine that overprints should be easier for a forger to falsify. It is just a simple matter of applying a few letters to a stamp with black ink. Paying attention to detail can reward a philatelic sleuth. The stamps of Bangkok from the 1880s were produced by overprinting each stamp a single letter "B" on stamps of the Straits Settlements. Some of these overprints are bogus because they are on underlying stamps that were never known to have been issued with that overprint. Forgeries can be discovered by examining the relative heights of the two loops of the B.

Another example, from New Zealand, is four stamps overprinted for an industrial exhibition held in Auckland in 1913. The accompanying image shows genuine overprints, and forged overprints from an internet auction. A New Zealand dealer prices a set of postally used stamps with genuine overprints at NZD 1600, while the same four stamps, postally used without the overprint, are priced at NZD 8. This indicates the potentially lucrative payoff for forgers.

In another example the 1948 Gandhi stamps of India were overprinted with the single word "SERVICE" to produce a stamp for official government use. The key to knowing the difference between the two is based on recognizing the difference between a typographed and a lithographed overprint. The former will leave an impression in the paper which can be detected by looking at the back of the stamp.

=== Reperforating ===
For many years, sheets of stamps were generally cut into four quarters (panes) before being perforated. This produced many stamps that were perforated on only three sides. On a pane of 100, for example, 18 stamps appeared with a single straight edge, the single (corner) stamp lacked perforations on two sides, and only 81 stamps were perforated on all four sides. (A pane of 50 commemorative-sized stamps typically contained only 36 fully perforated copies.) Because stamps with a straight edge are less desirable to collectors—and fetch lower prices—than fully perforated examples, unscrupulous dealers have "reperforated" many older straight-edged stamps: that is, they have carefully cut false perforations into the flat side, so that the copy can be sold for the same price as a normally perforated version.

In other cases a valuable and a common variety of a stamp may differ only by the presence or size of the perforations. Thus new perforations are cut into the stamp, or perforations are cut off to make a common stamp appear like a rare imperforate or rare coil issue.

=== Repairs ===
In some cases the value of a damaged stamp can be enhanced by repairing the damage.

=== Colour changes ===
The colour of a stamp can be changed by exposing the stamp to various chemicals, or by leaving it out in bright sunlight. Carefully applied chemicals can also be used to remove specific colours to produce "rare" missing colour varieties.

=== False postmarks ===
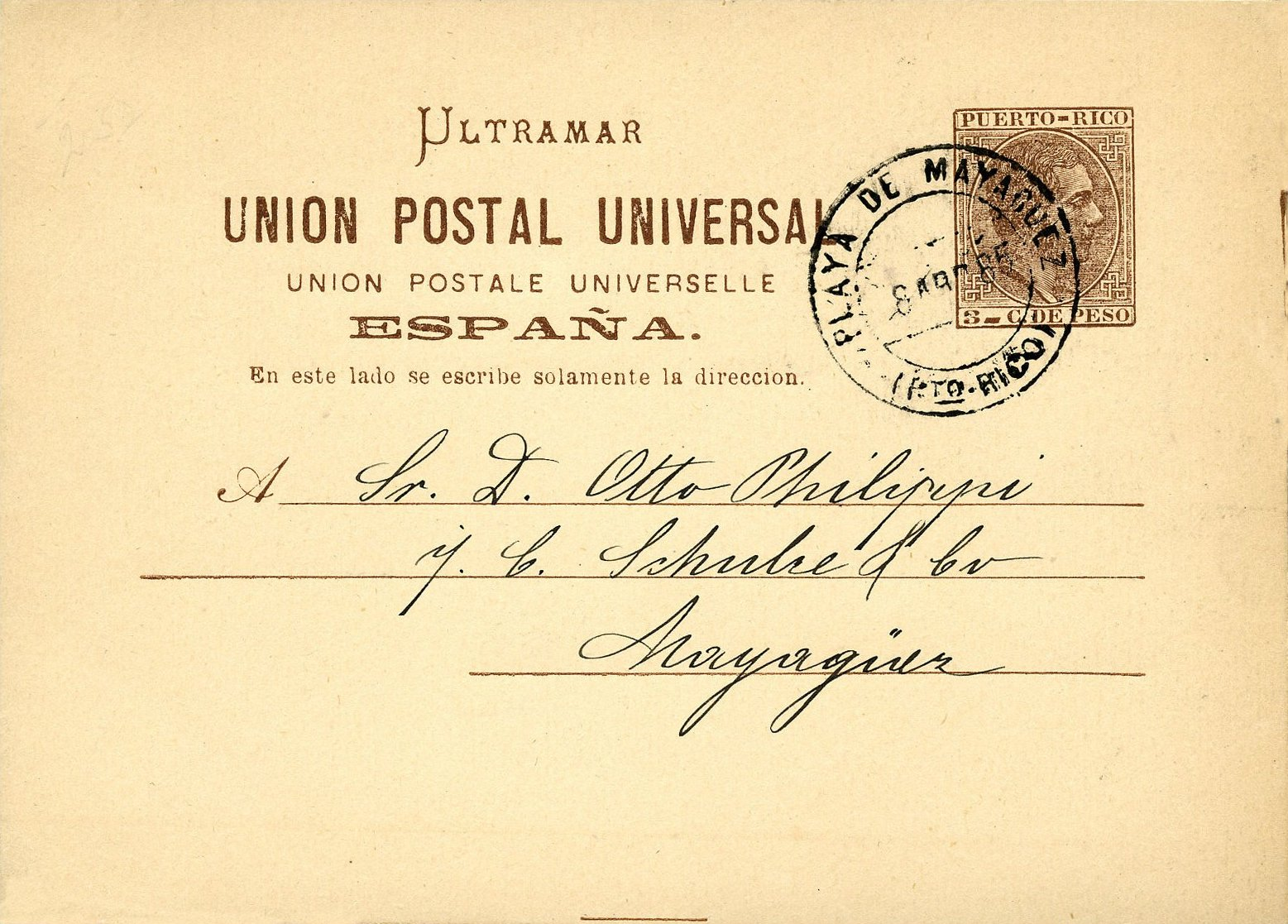
A postal card canceled on "8 April 1885". This was thought to be a genuine (and quite valuable) used card until a noted collector of Puerto Rican postal stationery noticed that he had other cards postmarked Mayagüez and addressed to the same recipient who lived in Mayagüez, who he knew to be a representative of the Senf brothers, stamp dealers in Leipzig, Germany. The other cards were dated 8 April 1887 (for the 1887 card), and 8 April 1893 (for the 1893 card). This led him to the conclusion that the recipient addressed them to himself and had a sympathetic or complicit postal clerk fraudulently back date the year to match the card's date of origin. He probably then sent the uncirculated, but postmarked, cards to the Senf brothers who sold them to collectors.

There are many instances of stamps that have been produced in large quantities, but where comparatively very small numbers have done postage service. Huge quantities of mint stamps can be left over after a bout of inflation, a political overthrow or loss of a war. In some cases a genuine stamp can have a fake cancellation applied to make it appear to be a rare, and valuable postally used example. A notable example is the 90¢ U. S. stamp of 1860, withdrawn within a year, on which a genuine cancellation raises the Scott Catalogue value from US $3,000 to $11,000. Scott's listing includes the caveat: "All used examples ... must be accompanied by certificates of authenticity issued by recognized expertizing committees."

It is also important to know that not all cancellations are postal. Some countries have inscribed their stamps "Postage and Revenue". Some very high face values on such stamps could not reasonably have been used for postage, thus making any kind of proper postal usage exceedingly rare. More commonly these high face values were for fiscal usages to indicate the payment of taxes on real estate or corporate shares. While such cancellations are not fakes, they can easily be misrepresented to the unwary as the more valuable postal cancellations. Rainer Blüm was sentenced in a high-profile German legal case for forgery of postmarks to increase the value of stamps.

=== Cancelled-to-order (CTO) ===
Technically CTOs are not fakes since they have been cancelled by the stamp issuing authority. Many of these are easily identified because while they have been postmarked they still retain their original gum. Some postal authorities cancel them and sell them at a considerable discount to the philatelic community. The authorities can do that profitably because they no longer need to provide the postal services that the stamps were meant to pay for. Many collectors are more interested in stamps that have been correctly used, and the corresponding used stamp may often be worth more than a mint stamp. Authorities who do this tend to use the same canceller for all CTOs, and apply it very neatly in the corner of four stamps at one time.

== See also ==
- Fakes Forgeries Experts
- Illegal stamp
- List of stamp forgers
- Outline of forgery
- Philatelic expertisation
- Russian philatelic forgeries
- Turner Collection of Forgeries, a collection of world forgeries to about 1900 that is part of the British Library Philatelic Collections
