= Outline of forgery =

Overview of and topical guide to forgery

The following outline is provided as an overview and topical guide to forgery:

Forgery – process of making, adapting, or imitating objects, statistics, or documents with the intent to deceive.

== Types of forgery ==
- Archaeological forgery
- Art forgery
- Black propaganda — false information and material that purports to be from a source on one side of a conflict, but is actually from the opposing side
- Counterfeiting
  - Counterfeit money — types of counterfeit coins include the cliché forgery, the fourrée and the slug
  - Counterfeit consumer goods
  - Counterfeit medication
  - Counterfeit watches
  - Unapproved aircraft parts
  - Watered stock
- Forgery as a covert operation
- Identity document forgery
  - Fake passport
- Literary forgery
  - Fake memoirs
  - Pseudopigraphy — the false attribution of a work, not always as an act of forgery
- Musical forgery — music allegedly written by composers of past eras, but actually composed later by someone else
- Philatelic forgery — fake stamps produced to defraud stamp collectors
- Signature forgery

== Legality of forgery ==
=== Kenya ===
- Forgery of Foreign Bills Act 1803
- Forgery Act 1830
- Forgery, Abolition of Punishment of Death Act 1832
- Forgery Act 1837
- Forgery Act 1861
- Forgery Act 1870
- Forgery Act 1913
- Forgery and Counterfeiting Act 1981

=== International ===
- Anti-Counterfeiting Trade Agreement
- Council of Europe Convention on the Counterfeiting of Medical Products

=== Related offences ===
- Phishing — impersonating a reputable organization via electronic media, which often involves creating a replica of a trustworthy website
- Uttering — knowingly passing on a forgery with the intent to defraud

== Detection and prevention of forgery ==
=== Anti-counterfeiting agencies and organisations ===
- Authentics Foundation — an international non-governmental organization that raises public awareness of counterfeits
- Central Bank Counterfeit Deterrence Group — an international group of central banks that investigates emerging threats to the security of banknotes
- Counterfeit Coin Bulletin — a now-defunct publication of the American Numismatic Association
- Alliance Against Counterfeit Spirits — the trade association for the worldwide spirit industry's protection against counterfeit produce
- Philatelic Foundation — a major source of authentication for rare and valuable postage stamps
- United States Secret Service — the agency responsible for the prevention and investigation of counterfeit U.S. currency
- Verified-Accredited Wholesale Distributors — a program that offers accreditation to wholesale pharmaceutical distribution facilities

=== Tools and techniques ===
- Authentication — the act of confirming the truth of an attribute of a single piece of data claimed to be true by an entity.
- Counterfeit banknote detection pen — uses an iodine-based ink that reacts with the starch found in counterfeit banknotes
- EURion constellation — a pattern of symbols incorporated into banknote designs, which can be detected by imaging software
- Geometric lathe — a 19th-century lathe used for making ornamental patterns on the plates used in printing banknotes and stamps
- Microprinting — very small text hidden on banknotes or cheques, that is difficult to accurately reproduce
- Optical variable device — an iridescent image that cannot be photocopied or scanned
- Optically variable ink — ink that appears to change color depending on the angle it is viewed from
- Philatelic expertisation — the process whereby an expert is asked to give an opinion on whether a philatelic item is genuine
- Questioned document examination — a forensic science discipline that attempts to answer questions about disputed documents
- Security printing — the field of the printing industry that deals with the printing of items such as banknotes and identity documents
- Security thread — a thin ribbon threaded through a banknote, that appears as a solid line when held up to the light
- Taggant — a radio frequency microchip that can be tracked and identified
- Watermark — a recognizable image or pattern in paper that appears as various shades of lightness when viewed

== Examples of forgery ==
=== Archaeological forgery ===
- Acámbaro figures — over 32,000 ceramic figurines which appear to provide evidence for the co-existence of dinosaurs and humans
- Archaeoraptor — the supposed "missing link" between birds and tetrapod dinosaurs; constructed by rearranging pieces of genuine fossils
- AVM Runestone — a student prank that was believed to be an ancient Norse runestone
- Beringer's Lying Stones — fake fossils that were planted as an 18th-century prank
- Brandenburg stone — a stone slab bearing markings which appear to be letters of an unknown alphabet
- Calaveras Skull — a human skull that was thought to prove the existence of Pliocene-age man in North America
- Cardiff Giant — a ten-foot-tall "petrified man" carved out of gypsum
- Chiemsee Cauldron — a golden cauldron found at the bottom of a lake
- Crystal skull — a series of artifacts crafted from quartz, often attributed to Aztec or Mayan civilizations
- Drake's Plate of Brass — supposedly a brass plaque planted by Francis Drake upon arrival in America, but a practical joke that spun out of control
- Grave Creek Stone — a small sandstone disk inscribed with twenty-five pseudo-alphabetical characters
- Holly Oak gorget — a mammoth engraved upon a shell pendant
- Ica stones — a collection of andesite stones that depict dinosaurs co-existing with humans
- Japanese Paleolithic hoax — many paleolithic finds manufactured by amateur archaeologist Shinichi Fujimura to bolster his reputation
- Kafkania pebble — a small rounded pebble bearing what could be an early example of Greek syllabic writing
- Kinderhook plates — six bell-shaped pieces of brass with strange engravings; Latter-Day Saints founder Joseph Smith allegedly attempted to translate them
- Lead Books of Sacromonte — a series of texts inscribed on circular lead leaves, denounced as heretical forgeries by the Vatican in 1682; modern scholars concur with this analysis
- Lenape Stone — an engraving that appears to show Native Americans hunting a woolly mammoth
- Michigan relics — artifacts that appear to prove that East Europeans lived in Michigan in ancient times; a money-making scam
- The inscription at Pedra da Gávea — allegedly carved by Phoenicians, who were not thought to have had the naval capacity to travel across the ocean to Brazil
- Persian Princess — the mummified body of a "Persian princess"; the corpse of a woman who was murdered around 1996
- Piltdown Man — the jaw of an orangutan attached to the skull of a human, hailed as the missing link between humans and apes
- Sherborne bone — a bone with a horse's head engraved on it, now known to be a schoolboy prank
- Solid Muldoon — a "petrified human" made out of the mortar, rock dust, clay, plaster, ground bones, blood, and meat
- Spirit Pond runestones — small stones bearing runic inscriptions, ostensibly of pre-Columbian origin
- Tiara of Saitaferne — a tiara exhibited at the Louvre Museum as belonging to a Scythian king, until this statement was disputed by the goldsmith who created it
- Vinland map — an allegedly 15th-century map of the world, which would have been be the earliest map to depict America (or "Vinland")

=== Art forgery ===
- Amarna Princess — a statue created by Shaun Greenhalgh in the ancient Egyptian style, and sold to Bolton Museum for £439,767
- Black Admiral — a Revolutionary War-era painting of a black man in a naval uniform
- Bust of Flora — a bust of the Roman goddess Flora, previously believed to be a work by Leonardo da Vinci, now attributed to Richard Cockle Lucas.
- Camille Corot forgeries — thousands of imitation Jean-Baptiste-Camille Corot paintings
- Eadred Reliquary — a silver vessel created by Shaun Greenhalgh, containing a piece of wood which he claimed was a fragment of the True Cross
- Etruscan terracotta warriors — three terracotta warriors created by Italian forgers and sold to the Metropolitan Museum of Art
- The Faun — a sculpture created by Shaun Greenhalgh and sold as a work by Paul Gauguin
- Flower portrait — a portrait of William Shakespeare, probably painted in the 19th century
- Michelangelo's Cupid — a sleeping Cupid sculpture that was created, artificially aged and sold by Renaissance artist Michelangelo
- Risley Park Lanx — the replica of a genuine Roman artifact, "discovered" by the Greenhalgh family and put on display at the British Museum
- Rospigliosi Cup — a gold and enamel cup thought to have been crafted by Italian goldsmith Benvenuto Cellini, but now considered a 19th-century forgery
- The works of the Spanish Forger — an unidentified 19th-century artist who created over 200 medieval miniatures, which are still highly valued by collectors

=== Black propaganda ===
- The Franklin Prophecy — an anti-Semitic speech falsely attributed to Benjamin Franklin, arguing against the admittance of Jewish immigrants to the newly formed United States
- Morey letter — a letter published during the 1880 US presidential elections, suggesting that James A. Garfield was in favor of Chinese immigration
- Our Race Will Rule Undisputed Over The World — a speech given by the non-existent Rabbi Emanuel Rabinovich, outlining Jewish plans for world domination
- A Protocol of 1919 — a document supposedly found among the belongings of a Jew killed in battle, outlining Jewish plans for world domination
- The Protocols of the Elders of Zion — a lengthy text, originating in Russia and widely publicized by the Nazi party, outlining Jewish plans for world domination
- A Radical Program for the Twentieth Century — a text supposedly written by a British Jewish Communist, cited as proof that the civil rights movement in America was a foreign Communist plot
- Tanaka Memorial — an alleged Japanese strategic planning document, advising Emperor Hirohito on how to conquer the world

=== Counterfeiting ===
- 2012 Pakistan fake medicine crisis — a batch of counterfeit medicine that killed over 100 heart patients at a hospital in Punjab
- Counterfeit United States currency — some notable examples of counterfeit operations
- Fake Indian Currency Note — fake currency in circulation in the Indian economy
- Operation Bernhard — a Nazi plot to destabilize the British economy by dropping counterfeit notes out of aircraft
- Superdollar — a very high-quality counterfeit the United States hundred dollar bill
- Partnair Flight 394 — a chartered flight that crashed in 1989, killing all 55 people on board; it was caused by counterfeit aircraft parts
- Unauthorized Apple Stores in China — twenty-two unauthorized Apple Stores discovered in Kunming

=== Forged documents ===
- Canuck letter — a letter implying that a Democratic presidential candidate was prejudiced against French-Canadians
- Casket letters — letters and sonnets supposedly written by Mary, Queen of Scots, implicating her in the murder of her husband
- Donation of Constantine — a decree issued by emperor Constantine I, granting authority over Rome and part of the Roman Empire to Pope Sylvester I and his successors
- Dossiers Secrets — documents, planted in the National Library of France, that were used as the basis for a series of BBC documentaries
- Habbush letter — a letter linking Saddam Hussein to al-Qaeda and the 9/11 attacks
- Killian documents — memos critical of President George W. Bush's service in the National Guard
- Larmenius Charter — a Latin manuscript listing twenty-two successive Grand Masters of the Knights Templar
- Lindsay pamphlet scandal — pamphlets distributed by the Australian Liberal Party, claiming an alliance between the Labor Party and an Islamic organization
- Mustafa-letter — a letter used by Norway's Liberal Party to prove that the country was in danger of being overrun with Muslims
- Niger uranium forgeries — documents implying that Saddam Hussein had attempted to purchase yellowcake uranium powder, allegedly to build weapons of mass destruction
- Oath of a Freeman — a copy of the loyalty oath drawn up by 17th-century Pilgrims
- Privilegium Maius — a medieval manuscript boosting the legitimacy and influence of the House of Habsburg
- Pseudo-Isidorian Decretals — letters and canons purportedly authored by early popes, including a collection authored by "Benedict Levita".
- William Lynch speech — a speech by an 18th-century slave owner, who claims to have discovered the secret of controlling slaves by pitting them against each other
- Zeno map — a map of the North Atlantic containing many non-existent islands
- Zinoviev letter — a directive from Moscow to Britain's Communist Party, calling for intensified communist agitation; the letter contributed to the downfall of Prime Minister MacDonald

=== Literary forgery ===
- The Aquarian Gospel of Jesus the Christ — a religious text supposedly transcribed from the Akashic records
- The Archko Volume — a series of supposedly contemporary reports relating to the life and death of Jesus
- Autobiography of Howard Hughes — an "autobiography" of reclusive eccentric Howard Hughes, written without his knowledge or consent
- Book of Jasher — an alternative account of the Old Testament narrative
- Book of Veles — a set of Slavic texts written on wooden planks
- Centrum Naturae Concentratum — a 17th-century alchemical text
- Christine — a compilation of letters purportedly written by an English girl studying in Germany in 1914, before the outbreak of war
- Chronicle of Huru — supposedly an official chronicle of the medieval Moldavian court
- Chronicon of Pseudo-Dexter — a 15th-century account of the Church's activities in Spain, attributed to Flavius Dexter
- De Situ Britanniae — an 18th-century forgery represented as a Roman account of ancient Britain
- Epistle to the Alexandrians — an unknown text derided as a forgery in a 7th-century manuscript
- Epistle to the Laodiceans — a lost letter of Saint Paul, often "rediscovered" by forgers
- Essene Gospel of Peace — a text which claims, among other things, that Jesus was a vegetarian
- Gospel of Josephus — a forgery created to raise publicity for a novel
- Historias de la Conquista del Mayab — a Mexican manuscript supposedly written by an 18th-century monk
- History of the Captivity in Babylon — an ostensibly Old Testament text elaborating on the Book of Jeremiah
- Hitler Diaries — a set of volumes purported to be the diaries of Adolf Hitler, serialized in the German magazine Stern and the British Sunday Times
- Ireland Shakespeare forgeries — forged correspondence between Shakespeare and his contemporaries, and a "lost play" entitled Vortigern and Rowena
- Jack the Ripper Diary — the forged diary of Victorian merchant James Maybrick, apparently revealing him to be Jack the Ripper
- Letter of Benan — the letter of an Egyptian physician describing his encounters with Jesus
- Letter to an Anti-Zionist Friend — a letter in support of Zionism, attributed to Martin Luther King Jr.
- The Lost Chapter of the Acts of the Apostles — the "missing" 29th chapter of the Acts of the Apostles
- Memoirs Of Mr. Hempher, The British Spy To The Middle East — a document purporting to be the account of an 18th-century secret agent, describing his role in founding the Islamic reform movement of Wahhabism
- Manuscripts of Dvůr Králové and Zelená Hora — fraudulent Slavic manuscripts created in the early 19th century
- Minuscule 2427 — a minuscule manuscript of the Gospel of Mark
- Mussolini diaries — several forged diaries supposedly written by the Italian dictator Benito Mussolini
- My Sister and I — an autobiographical work attributed to the philosopher Nietzsche, containing a probably fictional account of his incestuous relationship with his sister
- Oahspe: A New Bible — a New Age bible written by an American dentist
- Ossianic poems — a cycle of epic poems published by the Scottish poet James Macpherson, attributed to the legendary Ossian
- Roxburghe Ballads — over a thousand 17th-century ballads published by John Payne Collier, some of which he had written himself
- Salamander Letter — a document that offers an alternative account of Joseph Smith's finding of the Book of Mormon.
- Sixth and Seventh Books of Moses — a magical text supposedly written by Moses, providing instructions on how to perform the miracles portrayed in the Bible
- The Songs of Bilitis — a collection of erotic poetry allegedly found on the walls of a tomb in Cyprus
- Supplements to the Satyricon — several forged versions of the Latin novel Satyricon
- Talmud Jmmanuel — a supposedly ancient Aramaic text suggesting an extraterrestrial origin for the Bible
- The Zohar — a primary text of medieval Kabbalah, written by a 16th-century Spanish Rabbi but attributed to Rabbi Shimon Bar Yochai, an ancient sage of the Second Temple period

=== Musical forgery ===
- Adélaïde Concerto — a violin concerto attributed to Mozart

=== Philatelic forgery ===
- Russian philatelic forgeries — some examples of notable Russian stamp forgeries
- Stock Exchange forgery 1872–73 — a fraud perpetrated by telegraph clerks at the London Stock Exchange
- Turner Collection of Forgeries — a collection of forged postage stamps on display at the British Library

== Forgery controversies ==
The authenticity of certain documents and artifacts has not yet been determined and is still the subject of debate.

- Augustan History — a collection of biographies of Roman emperors
- Bat Creek inscription — an inscription on a stone allegedly found in a Native American burial mound
- Isleworth Mona Lisa — a close imitation of da Vinci's Mona Lisa, sometimes attributed in part to da Vinci
- James Ossuary — a chalk box used to contain the bones of the dead, bearing the inscription "James, son of Joseph, brother of Jesus"
- Jehoash Inscription — an inscription confirming the Biblical account of the repairs made to the temple in Jerusalem by Jehoash
- Jordan Lead Codices — a series of ring-bound books of lead and copper, that are said to pre-date the writings of St. Paul
- Kensington Runestone — a slab of greywacke covered in Scandinavian runes, found in North America and supposedly carved in the 14th century
- Letter of Lentulus — an epistle allegedly written by a Roman Consul, giving a physical description of Jesus
- Majestic 12 documents — supposedly leaked papers relating to the formation, in 1947, of a secret committee of US officials to investigate the Roswell incident
- Mar Saba letter — an epistle, attributed to Clement of Alexandria, discussing the Secret Gospel of Mark
- Newark Holy Stones — a set of artifacts allegedly discovered among a group of ancient Indian burial grounds
- Old High German lullaby — a supposedly 10th-century poem containing numerous references to Germanic mythology
- Prophecy of the Popes — a series of 112 short cryptic phrases which purport to predict future Roman Catholic Popes
- Shroud of Turin — a linen cloth that is said to be the burial shroud of Jesus, and bears the image of a man who appears to have suffered injuries consistent with crucifixion
- Sinaia lead plates — a set of lead plates written in an unknown language
- Sisson documents — sixty-eight Russian documents which claim that Trotsky and Lenin were German agents attempting to bring about Russia's withdrawal from World War I
- Stalin's alleged speech of 19 August 1939 — a speech supposedly given by Joseph Stalin in which he stated that the approaching war would benefit the Soviet Union
- Titulus Crucis — a piece of wood, ostensibly a fragment of the True Cross upon which Jesus was crucified
- US Army Field Manual 30-31B — a text purporting to be a classified appendix of a US Army Field Manual which describes top-secret counter-insurgency tactics

Some documents and artifacts were previously thought to be forgeries, but have subsequently been determined to be genuine.

- Bords de la Seine à Argenteuil — an oil painting by Monet
- Glozel artifacts — over three thousand artifacts dating back to the Neolithic era, discovered in a small French hamlet
- Lady of Elche — a stone bust believed to have been carved by the Iberians
- Praeneste fibula — a golden brooch bearing an inscription in Old Latin

== Notable forgers ==
=== Archaeological forgers ===
- Charles Dawson (1864–1916) — "discoverer" of the Piltdown Man
- Shinichi Fujimura (born 1950)
- Oded Golan (born 1951) — accused of forging the James Ossuary, among other things; he was acquitted of these charges in March 2012
- Islam Akhun
- Brigido Lara
- Moses Shapira (1830–1884)

=== Art forgers ===
- Giovanni Bastianini (1830–1868)
- William Blundell (born 1947)
- Chang Dai-chien (1899–1983)
- Yves Chaudron
- Alceo Dossena (1878–1937)
- John Drewe (born 1948)
- Kenneth Fetterman
- Alfredo Fioravanti (1886–1963)
- Shaun Greenhalgh (born 1961) — described by the Metropolitan Police as "the most diverse art forger known in history"
- Guy Hain
- Eric Hebborn (1934–1996)
- Elmyr de Hory (1905–1976) — subject of the Orson Welles documentary F for Fake
- Geert Jan Jansen (born 1943)
- Tom Keating (1917–1984)
- Konrad Kujau (1938–2000) — the author of the Hitler Diaries
- Mark A. Landis (born 1955)
- Lothar Malskat (1913–1988)
- Han van Meegeren (1889–1947) — estimated to have earned the equivalent of over thirty million dollars for his forgeries
- Jacques van Meegeren (1912–1977)
- John Myatt (born 1945)
- Sámuel Literáti Nemes (1796–1842)
- Edmé Samson (1810–1891)
- Ely Sakhai (born 1952)
- Jean-Pierre Schecroun
- Émile Schuffenecker (1851–1934)
- Karl Sim (born 1923)
- David Stein (1935–1999)
- Tony Tetro (born 1950)
- Robert Thwaites
- Franz Tieze (1842–1932)
- William J. Toye (born 1931)
- Eduardo de Valfierno — allegedly masterminded the 1911 theft of the Mona Lisa
- Kenneth Walton (born 1967) — author of the memoir Fake: Forgery, Lies, & eBay
- E. M. Washington (born 1962)
- Theo van Wijngaarden (1874–1952)

=== Counterfeiters ===
- Philip Alston (c. 1740 – after 1799)
- Anatasios Arnaouti (born 1967)
- Trevor Ashmore
- Robert Baudin (1918–1983)
- Charles Black (1928–2012)
- William Booth (c. 1776 – 1812)
- Mary Butterworth (1686–1775)
- William Chaloner (c. 1665 – 1699)
- Louis Colavecchio
- The Cragg Vale Coiners
- Thomas Dangerfield (c. 1650 – 1685)
- Mike DeBardeleben (1940–2011)
- John Duff (c. 1759 – 1799)
- Edward Emery (died c. 1850)
- David Farnsworth
- Bernhard Krüger (1904–1989) — director of the Nazi counterfeiting plot codenamed Operation Bernhard
- Ignazio Lupo (1877–1947)
- Catherine Murphy (died 1789) — the last woman to be executed by burning.
- Emanuel Ninger (1845–1927)
- Bernard von NotHaus — inventor of the Liberty Dollar
- Salomon Smolianoff (1899–1976) — WWII concentration camp detainee and key figure in Operation Bernhard
- Samuel C. Upham (1819–1885)
- Arthur Williams

=== Document forgers ===
- Frank Abagnale (born 1948) — subject of the film Catch Me If You Can
- Charles Bertram (1723–1765) — author of De Situ Britanniae
- Joseph Cosey (1887 – c. 1950)
- Przybysław Dyjamentowski (1694–1774)
- Michael John Hamdani
- Adolfo Kaminsky (born 1925)
- Jean LaBanta (born c. 1879)
- Maharaja Nandakumar (died 1775)
- Richard Pigott (1835–1889)
- Piligrim (died 991)
- James Reavis (1843–1914)
- Alves dos Reis (1898–1955)
- Scott Reuben (born 1958)
- Jerónimo Román de la Higuera (1538–1611)
- William Roupell (1831–1909)
- William Wynne Ryland (c. 1738 – 1783)
- Michael Sabo
- Alexander Howland Smith (fl. 1886)
- Robert Spring (1813–1876)
- Adolf Ludvig Stierneld (1755–1835)
- Brita Tott (fl. 1498)
- Lucio Urtubia (born 1931)
- Denis Vrain-Lucas (1818–1880)
- Henry Woodhouse (1884–1970)

=== Literary forgers ===
- Annio da Viterbo (c. 1432 – 1502)
- Sir Edmund Backhouse, 2nd Baronet (1873–1944)
- Adémar de Chabannes (c. 988 – 1034)
- Thomas Chatterton (1752–1770)
- Mark Hofmann (born 1954) — forger of several documents relating to the Latter Day Saint movement, including the Salamander letter
- William Henry Ireland (1775–1835) — author of the Ireland Shakespeare forgeries and the pseudepigraphical play Vortigern and Rowena
- Clifford Irving (1930–2017)
- William Lauder (c. 1680 – 1771)
- James Macpherson (1736–1796) — the supposed "translator" of the Ossianic poems
- Iolo Morganwg (1747–1826)
- François Nodot (c. 1650 – 1710)
- Francesco Maria Pratilli (1689–1763)
- Constantine Simonides (1820–1867)
- Clotilde de Surville (fl. 1421)
- Charles Weisberg (died 1945)

=== Musical forgers ===
- Henri Casadesus (1879–1947)
- Marius Casadesus (1892–1981) — creator of the Adélaïde Concerto
- François-Joseph Fétis (1784–1871)
- Fritz Kreisler (1875–1962)
- Winfried Michel (born 1948)
- David Popper (1843–1913)
- Roman Turovsky-Savchuk (born 1961)
- Vladimir Vavilov (1925–1973)
- Voller Brothers (1885-1927)

=== Signature forgers ===
- Henry Fauntleroy (1784–1824)
- James Townsend Saward (1799 – after 1857)

=== Stamp forgers ===
- A. Alisaffi
- Bernhardt Assmus (c. 1856 – after 1892)
- Rainer Blüm
- Delandre (1883–1923)
- Georges Fouré (1848–1902)
- François Fournier (1846–1917)
- Sigmund Friedl (1851–1914)
- Julius Goldner (c. 1841 – 1898)
- N. Imperato
- Madame Joseph (c. 1900 – after 1945)
- Louis-Henri Mercier (fl. 1890)
- Erasmo Oneglia (1853–1934)
- Adolph Otto (fl. 1870)
- Angelo Panelli (c. 1887 – c. 1967)
- Oswald Schroeder (died c. 1920)
- Lucian Smeets
- Jean de Sperati (1884–1957)
- Philip Spiro
- Béla Székula (1881–1966)
- Raoul de Thuin (1890–1975)
- Harold Treherne (c. 1884 – after 1908)

== Media ==
- The Art of the Faker — a book about art forgery by Frank Arnau
- The Counterfeiters — a movie inspired by the Nazi counterfeiting scheme, Operation Bernhard
- F for Fake — an Orson Welles documentary about art forger Elmyr de Hory
- Fake Britain — a BBC television series about counterfeiting and its effects on consumers
- Fake: Forgery, Lies, & eBay — a memoir by art forger Kenneth Walton
- Fake or Fortune? — a BBC television series which examines the provenance of notable artworks
- Frauds, Myths, and Mysteries: Science and Pseudoscience in Archaeology — a book by Kenneth L. Feder on the topic of pseudoarcheology
- Pierre Grassou — a novel by Honoré de Balzac about a fictional art forger
- Selling Hitler — an ITV drama-documentary about the Hitler Diaries
