= Ed Emery =

Ed Emery may refer to:

- Ed Emery (politician) (1950–2021), member of the Missouri House of Representatives (2003–2011) and the Missouri senate (from 2013)
- Ed Emery (writer) (born 1946), ethnomusicologist, writer, translator and political activist

== See also ==
- Edward Emery (died 1850), English numismatist and creator of forged coins
