= Giovanni Poggi =

Giovanni Poggi may refer to:

- Giovanni Poggio, also written Poggi, 16th century Italian bishop and cardinal
- Giovanni Poggi (historian) (1880–1961), Italian historian and museum curator
