= Cliché forgery =

Type of counterfeit coin

A cliché coin forgery is a type of counterfeit coin (a subtype of fourrée) produced using a genuine coin to impress a design into silver foil. Evidence of the probable manufacturing technique are finds of small lead sheets with multiple coin impressions and also fragments of impressed foils or complete 'coins'. The process seems to have involved the following steps. First, sandwiching a genuine coin between a fold of foil, generally silver, with a thickness of 50–100 microns. This was then placed between lead sheets (or a folded sheet) and the pile struck with a hammer. This resulted in the foils taking an impression of each face of the coin simultaneously, also incidentally transferred to the lead sheets (in incuse). The folded foil (retaining the coin impressions in register) was then removed and the resulting obverse and reverse impressions were then simply soldered together, usually with tin-lead solder. The final sandwich was then trimmed to size, possibly with a 'pastry cutter' type tool, forming a circular coin.

It is possible the foils could have been soldered around a copper or other metal core. Scanning electron microscope examination of the surface of these items clearly shows the coin design has been formed from the reverse of the foil (effectively in repoussé) instead of the front as would be the case with normal coin striking. This type of forgery is particularly suitable for the manufacture of small, thin coins. Counterfeits of this type have been found both from Classical antiquity and the Middle Ages. Unlike most fourrée coins, the technique does not require a press and counterfeit dies in order to manufacture the forgeries.

Chemical analysis of the silver foils and also the equivalent genuine coins shows them to be the same. This strongly suggests that the forger used genuine coins, or metal cut from them (clipping), to supply the material for the foils. This also ensured that the colour of the forgery matched that of the genuine coins. It is likely that 3 or 4 forgeries could be made from one genuine coin.

== Etymology ==
A single coin is used to make multiple counterfeits, analogous to a stereotype or cliché printing plate. The term "cliché" is used in French numismatics to refer to a thin electrotype copy of a coin or medal with the sides displayed separately so that they can both be seen at once.

== Cliché pair ==
A cliché is also a pair of thin blanks struck in a press with a mated pair of dies. They are used as proof impressions for the artist. Like many proofs, however, these have become desirable in themselves, and are acquired by museums specifically to allow the display of both sides of a coin or medal at once.

== See also ==
- Coin counterfeiting
- Fourrée
- Electrotyping
- Coin clipping
- Obverse and reverse
- Incuse
- Repoussé
- Numismatics
