= Adolfo Kaminsky =

French resistance member (1925–2023)

- Born: 1 October 1925; Buenos Aires, Argentina
- Died: 9 January 2023 (aged 97); Paris, France
- Occupation: Forger of documents

Adolfo Kaminsky (or Adolphe; 1 October 1925 – 9 January 2023) was an Argentine-born member of the French Resistance, specializing in the forgery of identity documents (IDs), and a photographer. During World War II, he forged papers that saved the lives of more than 14,000 Jews. He later assisted Jewish immigration to the British Mandate for Palestine and then forged identity documents for the Algerian National Liberation Front and French draft dodgers during the Algerian War (1954–62). He forged papers for thirty years for different activist groups, mainly national liberation fronts, without ever requiring payment in order to preserve his freedom.

== Early life ==
Kaminsky was born in Argentina to a Jewish Russian family, the son of Anna (Kinoël) and Salomon Kaminsky. In 1932, when Kaminsky was seven years old, he moved with his family to Paris, where his father worked as a tailor. From Paris, the family moved in 1938 to Vire, Calvados, where his uncle was established. Adolfo worked in a dye shop and became fascinated by the chemistry of colourants. At that time, he bought a treatise by Marcellin Berthelot at a flea market. He later created his own laboratory in his uncle's house and worked in a butter factory as an assistant to a chemist who taught him the basics.

== World War II ==
In 1940, after the German invasion of France, the family house in Vire was taken by the Germans and Kaminsky temporarily lived in another house, in which Michel Drucker's father was also hosted. His mother was killed by the Nazis in 1941. Aged 17, Adolfo Kaminsky entered the Resistance. At first he watched the railway station at Vire from where railcars of the Todt Organization, loaded with material for the Atlantic Wall, transited. He sent messages to London about these trains. However, in 1943 his family was interned in the camp of Drancy, as a prelude to deportation. Thanks to support from the Consul of Argentina, which had broken diplomatic relations with Nazi Germany under pressure from the United States, they were freed on 22 December 1943, and moved on to Paris.

Adolfo then worked in an underground lab in Paris (17, rue des St Pères) where he spent the rest of World War II forging identity papers for Jews and people sought by the Nazis. He was introduced to the network, the Resistance group, while seeking a false ID for his father. This group, made up of Jewish people from the General Jewish Union (including Marc Hamon, alias "the Pingouin", Suzie, Loutre, René, etc.) and called La Sixième, was having problems removing Waterman blue ink stains from papers. Adolfo suggested they use lactic acid, and thereafter joined the group, finally becoming responsible for the chemical forgery lab. They notably had to respond to the challenge of the introduction of watermarks as a security feature. Kaminsky also quickly learned photogravure under a false pretext, and set up a new lab in order to create "real-false" documents. The Kaminsky Lab became the main producer of false IDs for northern France and Benelux, although ties with other clandestine groups were discontinued, each group working as a cell.

Kaminsky used to say: "Stay awake. As long as possible. Struggle against sleep. The calculation is easy. In one hour, I make 30 false papers. If I sleep one hour, 30 people will die." Over the course of the war, Kaminsky created documents that saved the lives of 14,000 Jews.

After the Liberation of Paris in August 1944, he joined the French Army and marched to Germany. He was awarded the Médaille de la Résistance, and was engaged by the French military secret services, who entrusted him with making false IDs for spies sent behind enemy lines in order to investigate and detect the location of concentration camps before their dismantlement by the Nazis.

== Post-war ==
After the German capitulation, he helped forge documents for Jews attempting to immigrate to the British Mandate for Palestine from 1946 to 1948, in defiance of British immigration restrictions (see also Bricha). He also assisted operatives from the anti-British militant groups Irgun and Lehi as they waged a violent campaign against the British. After the foundation of Israel, he stopped doing this work, refusing to support a "religious state" that endorsed the secular-religious status quo and that included an important State role for the Chief Rabbinate of Israel; he became a photographer.

Kaminsky resigned from the French military at the beginning of the First Indochina War, unwilling to collaborate in a colonial war. He thereafter continued to forge papers for various groups, working first with the National Liberation Front of Algeria (FLN) and French draft dodgers by setting up a clandestine lab in Paris. He collaborated with the Jeanson network and Henri Curiel during the Algerian War. In 1962 he produced a cubic meter of 100 Franc notes (estimated value 100 million Francs) to help the FLN fight by destabilising the French currency and thus the economy. When the cease-fire was declared in March 1962, the notes were burned in a huge bonfire. Kaminsky later said, "It never entered our heads to keep the notes. Money always leads to problems."

Starting in 1963, he assisted various leftist movements from Latin America (Argentina, Brazil, Chile, Colombia, Dominican Republic, El Salvador, Haiti, Mexico, Nicaragua, Perú, Uruguay, Venezuela); Africa (Angola, Guinea-Bissau, South Africa) and from Portugal (then under Salazar's dictatorship) and Francoist Spain. He trained many people in forgery in order to support them in their respective struggles. He always worked for free in order to be able to refuse a job if he did not support the ideas—the only exception being during World War II, when the lab took up all his expenses in order to allow him to dedicate himself full-time to the job.

Kaminsky also supported the Greeks struggling against the regime of the Colonels, and made false ID papers for American draft dodgers during the Vietnam War. In 1968, he made a false ID for Daniel Cohn-Bendit to allow him to speak at a meeting—he would later say: "It was certainly the least useful [forgery], but it was a way of showing that there is nothing more porous than borders and that ideas transcend them".

Kaminsky made his last false ID in 1971. He gave up his forgery career after he was asked to forge South African passports for anti-apartheid guerrillas in South Africa, but soon realized it was an entrapment operation to incriminate him. He never found out who tried to incriminate him, though speculation was that the secret police of the apartheid regime were behind it.

Kaminsky subsequently lived for ten years in Algiers and married an Algerian woman. In total he had five children, including hip-hop singer Rocé.

In 1982, he moved to France with a temporary residence permit. All his family was naturalized French in 1992.

Kaminsky died on 9 January 2023, at the age of 97.

== Awards ==
Adolfo Kaminsky was awarded the Croix du Combattant, the Croix du combattant volontaire de la Résistance, and the Médaille de Vermeil de la ville de Paris for his acts during the Resistance.

== In the media ==
Jacques Falck made a documentary film about his life, Forging Identity. Adolfo's daughter Sarah, born in 1979, is an actress and writer who wrote a biography of her father, Adolfo Kaminsky, une vie de faussaire (Paris: Calmann-Lévy, 2009), which has been translated into Spanish and German, and also into English in 2016 as Adolfo Kaminsky: A Forger's Life.

A short film about Kaminsky entitled The Forger accompanied an online New York Times article in October 2016. The Travel Channel's show Mysteries at the Museum featured a segment on Kaminsky in its 12 October 2017 episode. On 29 October 2017, 60 Minutes told his story.

Kaminsky is also referenced in GS Carberry's novel In the Shadow of Monsters, set in WW2 and about the fictional character Niki Frolov and the French Resistance. The book is inspired by Kaminsky's life: "The almost incomprehensible courage of that man and other such individuals lit a fire in my heart. While Kaminsky does not feature in this book, I hope his character is, in some way, reflected in it."

== See also ==
- Identity document forgery
- Lucio Urtubia (Spanish anarchist, forger who attempted to disrupt the capitalist economy)
- Adolf Burger
