= Salomon Smolianoff =

Jewish counterfeiter

- סלומון סמוליאנוב
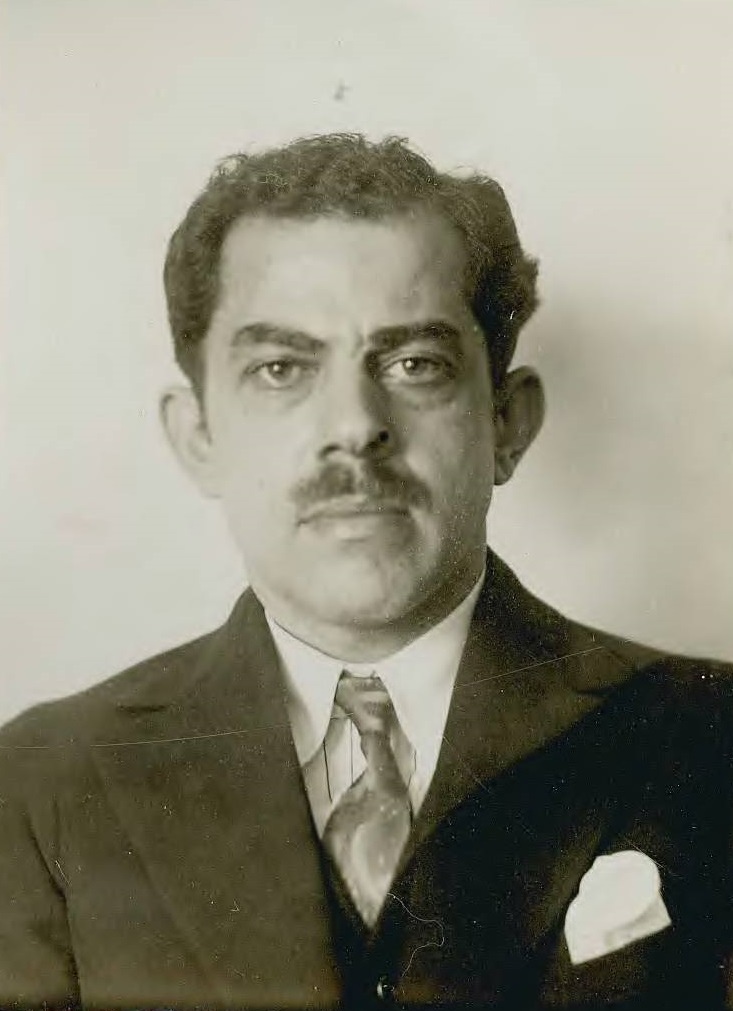
- Portrait photograph of Smolianoff
- Born: March 26th 1897; Kremenchuk, Russian Empire
- Died: 1976 (aged 78–79); Porto Alegre, Brazil
- Resting place: Cemitério Israelita, Porto Alegre
- Other names: Werner Mattheus, Lidral Hugo
- Citizenship: German, Brazilian
- Education: Art School
- Occupation(s): Forger; Nazi prisoner counterfeiter
- Known for: Operation Bernhard

Salomon Smolianoff (March 26, 1897 – November 14, 1976) was a Jewish counterfeiter and Holocaust survivor involved in Operation Bernhard. In the 2007 film The Counterfeiters based on Adolf Burger's memoirs (which film received a foreign-language Oscar for Austria in 2008), the character is renamed Salomon "Sally" Sorowitsch. The character is played by Karl Markovics, an Austrian stage and television actor.

== Life ==
Salomon Smolianoff was born to a Jewish family in Kremenchuk, Ukraine. He studied painting in the Russian Empire, but he had to leave the country in 1922 because his parents were on the wrong side of the Soviet Revolution. He went across Europe, was married in Italy, and finally tried to start a new life in Germany, where he met a counterfeiter and decided to become one himself. He was wanted by several European police forces prior to the outbreak of World War II. In 1939 Bernhard Krüger, future SS Sturmbannführer head of Operation Bernhard, put him behind bars. He was sent to the Mauthausen concentration camp, and made himself useful to the S.S. guards as a portraitist and artist. He was selected for Operation Bernhard, transferred to the Sachsenhausen concentration camp in 1944, and eventually to the Ebensee site of the Mauthausen camp network, where he was liberated by the US Army on 6 May 1945. All traces of the master counterfeiter Smolianoff were lost after his liberation. He was soon on international "Wanted" lists as a counterfeiter, but he is also believed to have forged emigration papers for Jews trying to go to Palestine.

He then emigrated to Uruguay, where he counterfeited Russian icons. The Uruguayan police apparently caught on, and Smolianoff moved to Brazil in the 1950s, where he went into the toy business.

Smolianoff died in Porto Alegre, in the south of Brazil, in 1976. He allegedly spent his last years painting portraits and creating toys.
