= Vincenzo Peruggia =

Italian decorator who stole the Mona Lisa (1881–1925)

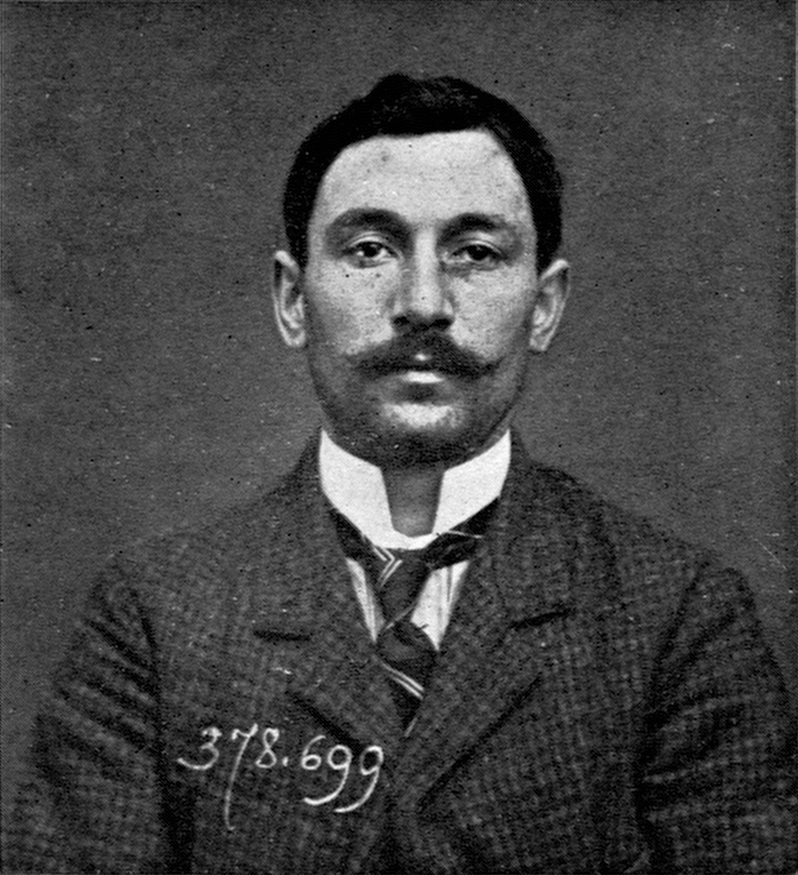
- A police photograph of Vincenzo Peruggia in 1909, two years before the theft of Mona Lisa
- Born: Pietro Vincenzo Antonio Peruggia; 8 October 1881; Dumenza, Varese, Kingdom of Italy
- Died: 8 October 1925 (aged 44); Saint-Maur-des-Fossés, France
- Other name: Pietro Peruggia
- Occupations: Decorator, soldier
- Known for: Theft of the Mona Lisa

Pietro Vincenzo Antonio Peruggia (8 October 1881 – 8 October 1925) was an Italian decorator best known for stealing the Mona Lisa from the Louvre, a museum in Paris where he had briefly worked as glazier, on 21 August 1911.

== Early life and work at the Louvre ==
Pietro Vincenzo Antonio Peruggia was born on 8 October 1881 in Dumenza, a small village in the Alps of Italy near the border with Switzerland to Celeste Rossi and Giacomo Peruggia. For a brief period after having moved to Paris in 1908, Peruggia obtained work at the Louvre, cleaning and reframing paintings. His job also required him to construct strong cases for some of the artwork in the museum, including the one for the Mona Lisa by Leonardo da Vinci; he was likely involved in Mona Lisa's box frame construction and would have known how to open it in minutes. After the painting was stolen, a curator investigated the matter and listed all the names involved, including Peruggia's. There was not much security at the Louvre, and its entry was free.

== Theft ==
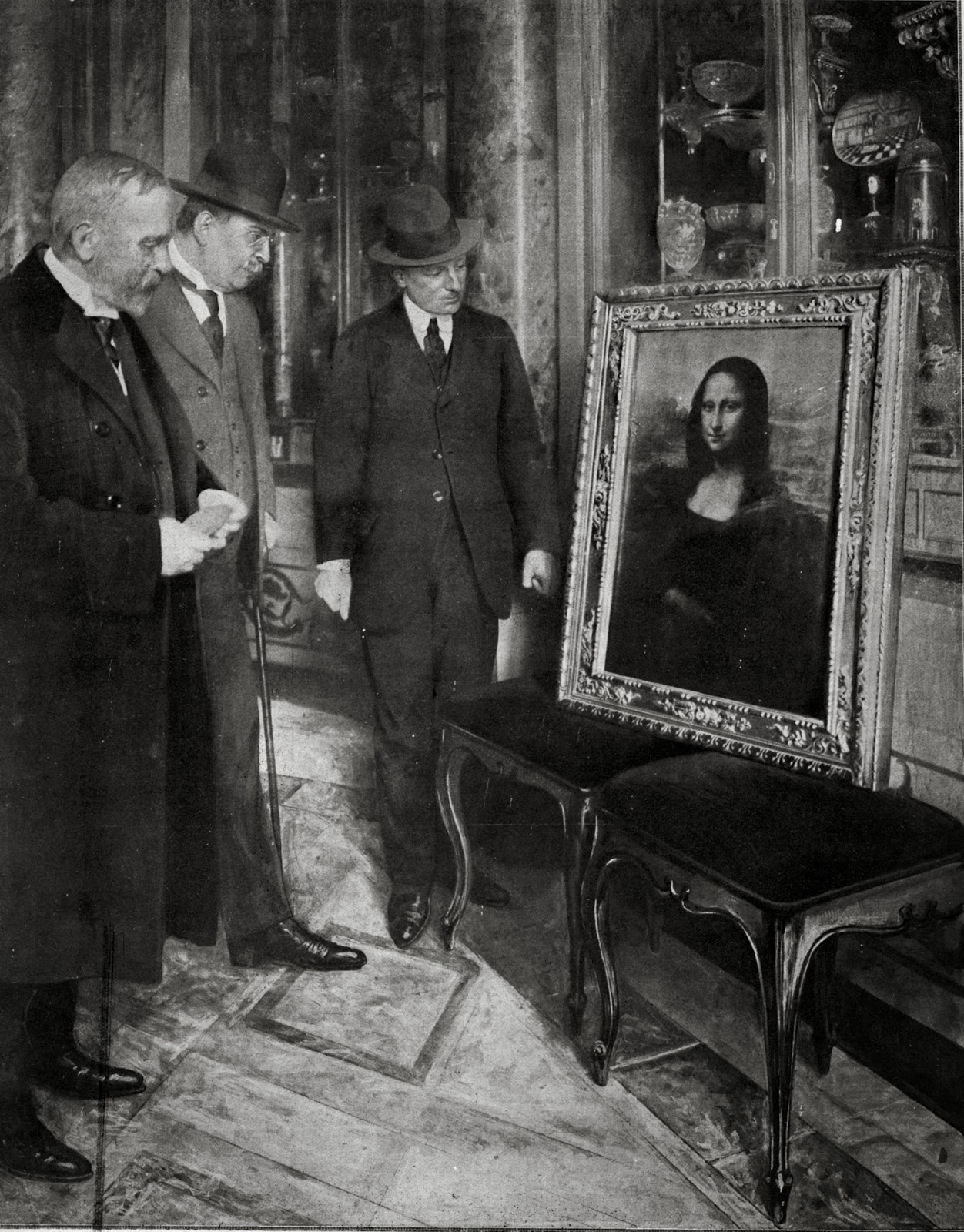
The Mona Lisa in the Uffizi Gallery in Florence, 1913. Museum director Giovanni Poggi (right) inspects the painting.

In 1911, Peruggia perpetrated what has been described as the greatest art theft of the 20th century. According to Peruggia's later interrogation in Florence, following his arrest on 12 December 1913, he said that he entered the Louvre on Monday, 21 August 1911, at around 7 am, through the door where the other Louvre workers were entering, wearing one of the white smocks that museum employees customarily wore, making himself indistinguishable from the other workers. It was a quiet morning, and the Louvre was nearly empty, because 21 August was the weekly closure day during the summer holidays.

When the Salon Carré, where the Mona Lisa hung, was empty, Peruggia lifted the painting off the four iron pegs that secured it to the wall between Antonio da Correggio's Mystical Marriage and Titian's Allegory of Alfonso d'Avalos and took it to a nearby service stairway of the Sept Mètres. There, he removed the protective case and frame, hiding the discarded elements behind some student artworks stored on the staircase landing. Some people report that he concealed the painting (which Leonardo da Vinci painted on wood) under his smock that was larger than him; however, Peruggia was only 160 centimetres (63 in) tall, and the Mona Lisa measures approximately 53 cm × 77 cm (21 in × 30 in), so it would not fit under a smock worn by someone of his size. Instead, he used a service door. A plumber, thinking he was an employee (Peruggia had finished working for the Louvre), unlocked the door for him, and Peruggia successfully left the museum. He then hid the painting in his apartment in Paris. The theft was not discovered until the following day, when a painter who was about to do a copy of the Mona Lisa found it missing. The director, who was on holiday, had boasted "steal the Mona Lisa? That would be like thinking that someone could steal the towers of Notre Dame cathedral." The arts minister was also away, having ordered "don't call me unless the Louvre burns down or the Joconde is stolen" (La Joconde is the French name of the Mona Lisa). At least 60 policemen scoured the Louvre in search of clues, and the top officer in charge of the investigation sounded confident, as he stated: "The theft took place on closing day, we know who came in and out, this investigation will only take two to three days." The painter Pablo Picasso and the poet Guillaume Apollinaire were arrested, and all passengers of an ocean liner set to sail were also searched. In New York, the police searched another ship in an attempt to retrieve the Mona Lisa.

=== Investigation and recovery ===
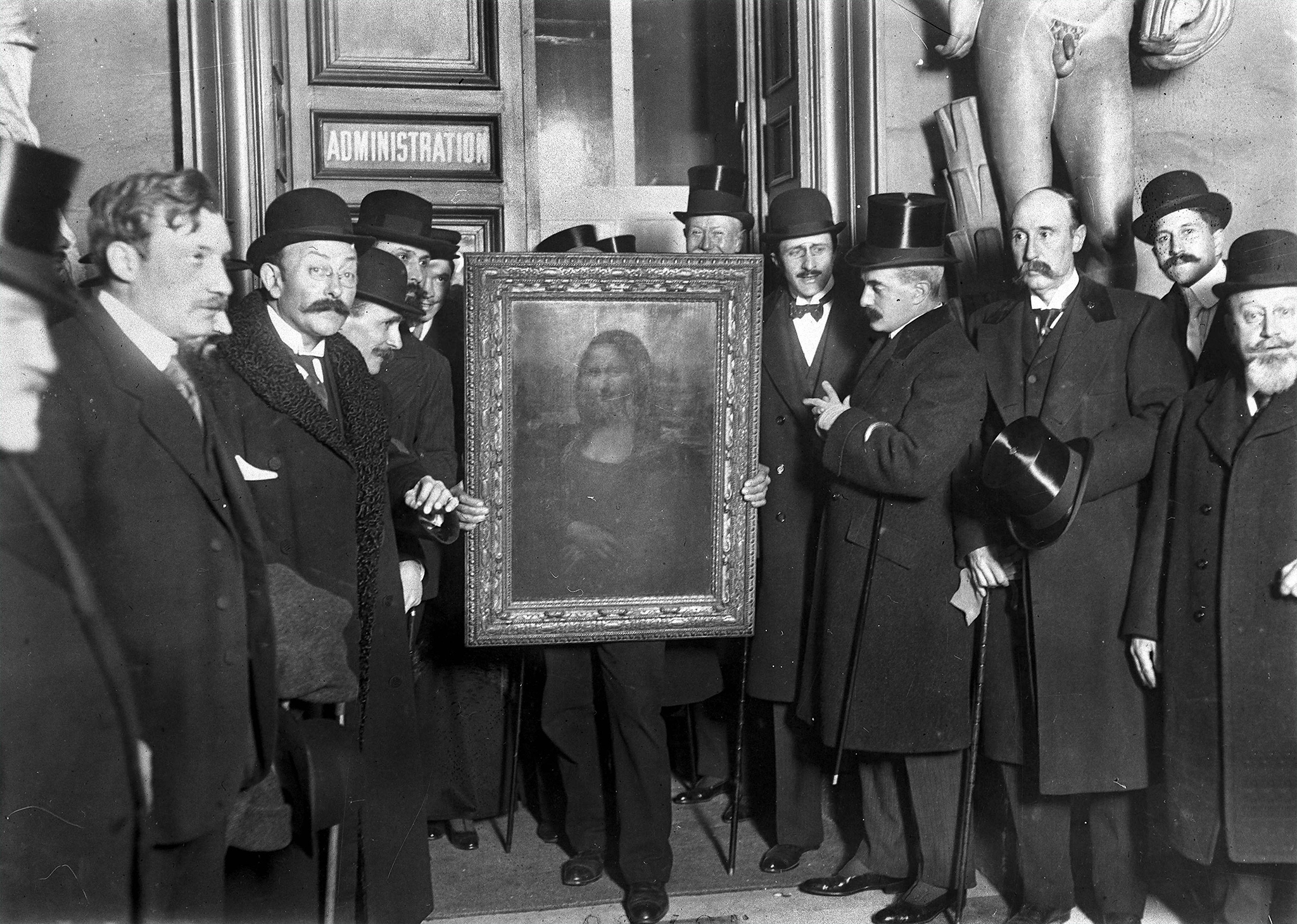
The Mona Lisa returned at the Louvre Museum, 4 January 1914

Having interrogated all of the Louvre's permanent staff, the National Gendarmerie began to interview extraneous workers, including bricklayers, decorators, and staff hired for short periods or for specific jobs in September 1911. During this period, officers visited Peruggia's apartment and questioned him twice about his possible involvement. However, he was not considered a primary suspect. It was only after Peruggia had failed to come to the police station twice that the police went to his apartment, where the painting was hidden. The detective failed to see it and believed Peruggia's explanations. Indeed, the detective finished writing his report by leaning on the table under which the painting had been hidden in a cavity. Despite the examining judge's order to follow the curators who had pointed to glaziers as prime suspects, the police did not follow that lead.

Peruggia had left a thumbprint on the glass securing the painting, and his fingerprints and photo were in police files as he had been arrested before. The police also knew that he had helped make the protective glass for the painting and that he was not working at the time of the robbery. All the museum employees had their fingerprints taken but not Peruggia, and the police forgot to add his name to the list of fingerprints to check against police records. Days after the theft, speculations began and a newspaper wrote an article imagining interviewing Mona Lisa, while others speculated that the theft was a "crime of passion", joked that Arsène Lupin was involved, and movies and songs poked fun at the turn of events. Knowing that a story could sell millions of copies, newspapers offered financial rewards for information, and for over two years, hundreds of false leads were sent to the police and the press. A witness described being "in the company of numerous other curious visitors, to stare at the empty space on the wall of the Louvre where the famous lady had hung."

After keeping the painting hidden in a trunk in his apartment for two years, Peruggia returned to Italy with it by train, after he saw adverts by antique dealers in an Italian newspaper. He kept it in his apartment in Florence for some time. Peruggia eventually grew impatient and was finally caught when he contacted Alfredo Geri, the owner of an art gallery in Florence, using the name Leonardo V. Geri's story conflicts with Peruggia's, but it was clear that Peruggia expected a reward for returning the painting to what he regarded as its homeland. Geri called in Giovanni Poggi, director of the Uffizi, who authenticated the painting. Poggi and Geri, after taking the painting for safekeeping, informed the police, who arrested Peruggia at his hotel. After its recovery, the painting was exhibited all over Italy with banner headlines rejoicing in its return. The Mona Lisa was then returned to the Louvre in 1913. While the painting had been famous before the theft, the notoriety it received from the newspaper headlines and the large-scale police investigation helped the artwork become one of the best known in the world, gaining considerable public interest. The New York Times ran the headline, "Florentines in riot over 'Mona Lisa'. Crowd of 30,000 sweeps police aside in mad rush to see stolen painting."

=== Motivations ===
There are two predominant theories regarding the theft of the Mona Lisa. Peruggia said he did it for a patriotic reason as he wanted to bring the painting back for display in Italy, in Peruggia's own words "after it was stolen from Italy" by Napoleon. When Peruggia worked at the Louvre, he learned of how Napoleon plundered many Italian works of art during the Napoleonic Wars. Perhaps sincere in his motive, Peruggia proclaimed "I am an Italian and I do not want the picture given back to the Louvre", and may not have known that Leonardo da Vinci took this painting as a gift for King Francis I when he moved to France to become a painter in his court during the 16th century, 250 years before Napoleon's birth. Experts question the patriotism motive on grounds that—‌were patriotism the true motive—‌Peruggia would have donated the painting to an Italian museum rather than have attempted to profit from its sale. The question of money is also confirmed by letters that Peruggia sent to his father after the theft. On 22 December 1911, four months after the theft, he wrote that Paris was where "I will make my fortune and that his [fortune] will arrive in one shot." The following year, he wrote: "I am making a vow for you to live long and enjoy the prize that your son is about to realize for you and for all our family."

Put on trial, the court agreed to some extent that Peruggia committed his crime for patriotic reasons and gave him a lenient sentence. He was sent to jail for one year and 15 days but was hailed as a great patriot in Italy and on appeal served only seven months. The invocation of mental infirmity was confirmed by a riddle posed to him by the court psychiatrist Paolo Amaldi, who took up his post on 24 May 1914. The riddle was "There are two birds in a tree. If a hunter shoots one of them, how many are left in the tree?" As Peruggia replied "One!", Amaldi called him "imbecile" as the answer to the riddle was zero because the other bird would have escaped. This, alongside popular pressure, had the effect of inducing the court to grant him extenuating circumstances and to impose the lenient sentence. After Peruggia's arrest, the patriotic Peruggism died down as most people were disappointed in Peruggia's calibre, and he has since been compared more to Lee Harvey Oswald than the criminal mastermind he was originally imagined. In the words of Donald Sassoon in his book Becoming Mona Lisa, "[Peruggia] was, quite clearly, a classic loser."

Peruggia had traveled to London to try to sell the Mona Lisa, as also evidenced by the court trial, where it was revealed that the dealer Joseph Duveen had laughed at him. Peruggia ultimately did not profit from his theft. Another theory later emerged, claiming the theft may have been encouraged or masterminded by Eduardo de Valfierno, a con man who had commissioned the French art forger Yves Chaudron to make copies of the painting so he could sell them as the missing original. The copies would have gone up in value if the original were stolen. This theory is based entirely on a 1932 article by former Hearst journalist Karl Decker in The Saturday Evening Post. Decker claimed to have known Valfierno and heard the story from him in 1913, promising not to print it until he learned of Valfierno's death. There is no external confirmation for this theory.

== Later life ==
Peruggia was released from jail after a short time and served in the Italian army during World War I. During the war, he was captured by Austria-Hungary and held as a prisoner of war for two years until the war ended and he was released. He later married Annunciata Rossi, had one daughter named Celestina (1924–2011), returned to France, and continued to work as a painter decorator using his birth name Pietro Peruggia. He died from a heart attack on 8 October 1925 (his 44th birthday) in the Paris suburb of Saint-Maur-des-Fossés. He was buried in the Condé Cemetery of Saint-Maur-des-Fossés. Sometime in the 1950s, Peruggia's remains were exhumed and relocated into the cemetery bonelocker. His death in 1925 was not widely reported by the media at the time, possibly because he died under the name of Pietro Peruggia; obituaries appeared mistakenly only when another Vincenzo Peruggia died in Haute-Savoie in 1947.

== In popular culture ==
Peruggia's theft is part of popular culture, and over the years it has been celebrated in books, films, and songs including "Mona Lisa" written in 1978 by Ivan Graziani. In Der Raub der Mona Lisa (1931), an early German sound film, Peruggia was portrayed by Willi Forst.

In an April 1956 episode of the TV show You Are There, called "The Recovery of the Mona Lisa (December 10, 1913)", Peruggia is played by Vito Scotti, who reprised the role in another TV reconstruction of the famous theft, this time for the TV-show GE True. The episode was called "The Tenth Mona Lisa" and aired in March 1963. Liana Bortolon's book The Life and Times of Leonardo also mentioned the theft.

George Chakiris played Peruggia in The Mona Lisa Has Been Stolen (1966).

In The Man Who Stole La Gioconda (it) (2006), a television miniseries, Peruggia was portrayed by Alessandro Preziosi.

In March 2012, Peruggia's mugshot was sold for €3,825 to an Italian buyer by the Parisian auction house Tajan. The small original silver gelatin print (123 x 54 mm) had been estimated by photography expert Jean-Mathieu Martini at between €1,500 and €1,800, excluding fees. The mugshot was taken in 1909 by Alphonse Bertillon, the inventor of the anthropometry system. In the summer of 2012, Peruggia's character was the hero of a play that depicted him as a patriot. The play was performed in his hometown of Dumenza, Lombardy. In a 2018 episode of Drunk History on Comedy Central, he was portrayed by Jack Black. In a 2023 episode of Murdoch Mysteries called "Murdoch and the Mona Lisa", he was portrayed by Johnathan Sousa. In the 2024 Summer Olympics opening ceremony, the theft is referenced by the Minions when they stole the Mona Lisa painting from its protective chamber.

The theft is memorialized in the song La Gioconda by the band Vulfpeck, which adopts the theory of a collaborator: "I'm not a one-man band. This plan requires two. And I can only pull this off next to you."

== See also ==
- Arsène Lupin, 1932 American film culminating in the theft and recovery of the Mona Lisa
- The Art of the Steal, 2013 Canadian film about a heist of a priceless historical book
- Kempton Bunton (1904–1976), British pensioner accused of art theft

== Bibliography ==
- Hoobler, Dorothy; Hoobler, Thomas (2009). The Crimes of Paris (hardcover ed.). New York: Little, Brown and Company. pp. 3–7, 305–314. ISBN 978-0-316-01790-9.
