= Trevor Ashmore =

English coin counterfeiter

Trevor Ashmore is a coin counterfeiter infamous for producing modern copies of ancient English coins in the 1960s.

Ashmore was a part-time coin dealer in the late 1960s and early 1970s. As he was a precision engineer he also made experimental coin dies. In 1972 he set up the company Period Coins in Sutton-in-Ashfield producing replica coins, selling mostly to numismatists in the United States. The business eventually failed but he remained in production of replica coins. After retirement in 1991 he began to produce forged coins commercially again.

Ashmore tended to concentrate on silver coins, which are especially dangerous to collectors since they are not hallmarked; his coins have appeared in the IBSCC's Bulletin on Counterfeits as well as Spink's Numismatic Circular, April 2000, pp. 50–54, coin no. 16.

Recently coins such as Edward I Farthing have emerged.
