= Oswald Schroeder =

Oswald Schroeder (died c. 1920) was a partner in the German printers Schroeder & Naumann of Leipzig, who in the 1870s and 1880s produced forgeries of classic stamps so good that they found their way into the best collections of the day and in some cases formed the reference from which other forgers worked.

Schroeder forged stamps of, amongst others, India, Argentina (Buenos Aires), Saxony, Hanover, France, Finland, Philippines, Cape of Good Hope, Mexico (Guadalajara), British Guiana, Colombia and the United States. François Fournier used Schroeder's forgery of the 3pf red stamp of Saxony as the basis for his own forgery of that stamp.

In an article in The London Philatelist, Edward Denny Bacon stated that most of the large collections of that era contained Schroeder forgeries and the Tapling Collection contained no fewer than ten.

After his forgeries became well known, Schroeder fled to Zurich, Switzerland, where he is believed to have died in about 1920. Examples of his work were found in the archives of the Swiss police and formed the basis for the 1981 work by Robson Lowe.
