= Charles Weisberg =

American forger

"Baron" Charles Weisberg (June 5, 1947) was a US document forger who forged manuscripts, letters and signatures of celebrities and historical figures.

Weisberg forged autographs and letters of celebrities like Francis Hopkinson and manuscripts of Walt Whitman and Stephen Collins Foster. He also expanded to alleged works of George Washington and Abraham Lincoln and created surveys of Mount Vernon.

When forging Lincoln's signature, Weisberg sometimes used original US Civil War letters and wrote an "extension" of the original. However, Weisberg created long letters when Lincoln had usually written shorter, punctual missives. Robert Spring also forged letters from Washington but tended to drop the beginning of the G in Washington's name and omit the "g" in "go". He also used modern inks.

Weisberg was first arrested 1935 in New York for forgery. He was later charged with mail fraud in Pennsylvania for selling forged documents and autographs through mail. His last forgery was a Katherine Mansfield inscription in a copy of The Dove's Nest – a book that had been published posthumously.

Weisberg served two contiguous prison sentences in the 1940s and died on June 5, 1947, in Atlanta Penitentiary in Georgia.
