= A. Alisaffi =

Turkish stamp dealer and forger

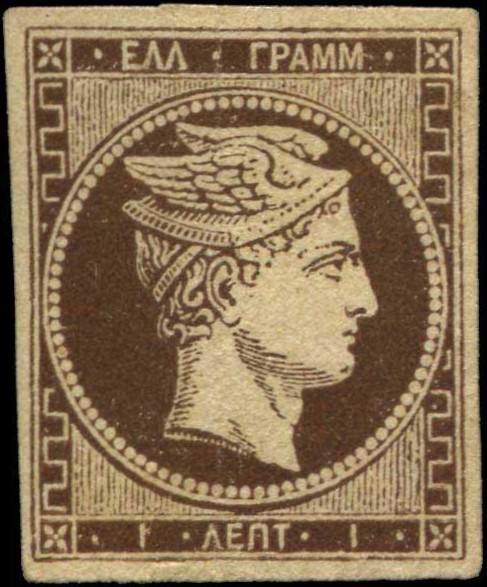
An Alisaffi forgery of the 1l. brown of the Large Hermes Head series of Greece.

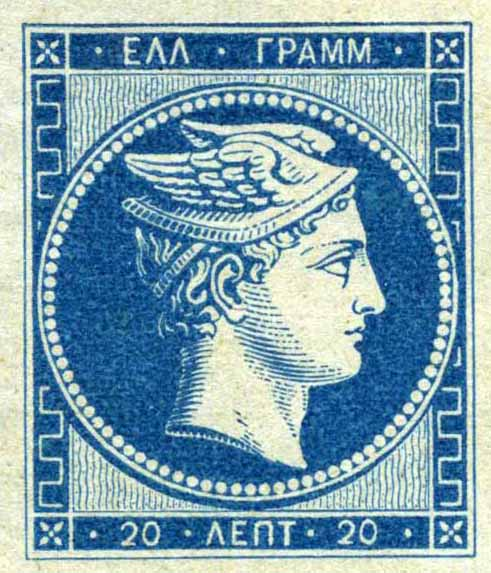
A genuine Large Hermes Head stamp of Greece (Paris printing).

A. Alisaffi was a stamp dealer and forger from Istanbul known for his reproductions of the Small and Large Hermes Head stamps of Greece. Material produced by Alisaffi was included on the representative album of forgeries prepared by the Union Philatelique de Genève after François Fournier's death in 1927.

== Career ==
Alisaffi was operating in Paris in 1902 when he produced by a photolithographic process reproductions of the small and large Hermes Head stamps of Greece. The stamps were sold as genuine or as reprints but when Alisaffi tried to sell them in Athens he was reported to the police by a stamp dealer. He subsequently received a permit allowing him to sell the stamps as they were without gum and no longer the current issues of Greece. The permit allowed him to sell a large quantity of stamps and over 30 different types are known, including imitations of both the Paris and Athens prints.

He collaborated with the forger François Fournier, who started his business in Geneva in 1903, and Alisaffi's reproductions were sold by Fournier and found in the representative album of Fournier forgeries prepared by the Union Philatelique de Genève after Fournier's death in 1927.

The forgeries are well known to specialists in Greek philately and were amongst those discussed in the work of Walter Dorning Beckton.

== See also ==
- List of stamp forgers
- Philatelic fakes and forgeries
