= Coin counterfeiting =

Fake antique and modern coins

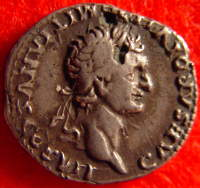
A fourrée denarius of Domitian (81–96 AD). By using a copper core covered in a silver coating, the coin has a much lower intrinsic value, while face value remains the same.

Counterfeiting of valuable antique coins is common; modern high-value coins are also counterfeited and circulated. Counterfeit antique coins are generally made to a very high standard so that they can deceive experts. This is not easy and many coins still stand out.

== History ==
Counterfeits of higher-value coins in circulation, designed for general circulation at face value, have been made by criminals for thousands of years.

== Circulating coins ==
A real British pound coin, of the old type, on top of a fake. This coin was often counterfeited.

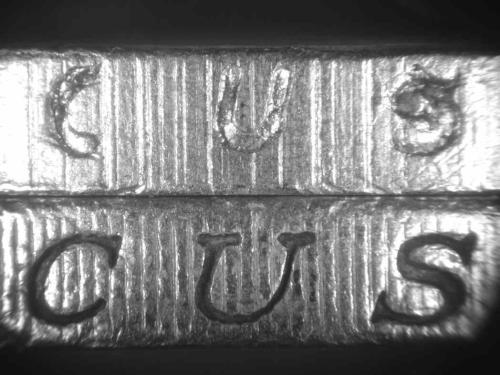
Defective milling and letters on a counterfeit coin (top)

For modern coins in general circulation, the most common method of protection from forgeries is the use of bi-metallic coins made of two metals of different color, which are difficult to counterfeit at low cost. The most common way of forging these coins is to change the area that should be a different color by painting it; however, the paint is often easy to scratch off and the coins soon look very crude once worn. An increasing number of coins are cast from the same composition alloy as the real coin, but have poor reproduction of details such as the milling on the side of the coin and the stamped lettering.

When the euro was introduced into Europe, there were initially very few counterfeits; however, the number increased massively as time went by. The high and increasing number of fake euro coins in circulation in 2004 led to the creation of a Technical and Scientific Center for the coordination of technical actions to protect euro coins against counterfeiting. Between 2002 and 2006, approximately 400,000 counterfeit euro coins were removed from circulation; however, "the overall number is very small by historical standards and by comparison to the 69 billion circulating (genuine) euro coins."

In 2014, it was estimated that 3.04% of all UK £1 coins in circulation were counterfeit. These coins were replaced on 15 October 2017 with new, harder to counterfeit, 12-sided bi-metallic coins.

== Collectible counterfeit coins ==
A well known and popular numismatic item is the 1944 nickel counterfeited by Francis LeRoy Henning. Unlike official specimens, this spurious item is missing a large mintmark for the Philadelphia Mint. Because of a different wartime composition, all nickels of this period had large mintmarks. Normally the Philadelphia mint would not have included one, but in 1944 all of its nickels had a "P" above the dome of Monticello. It is estimated that 100,000 of these coins were placed into circulation. Today they remain readily available to collectors.

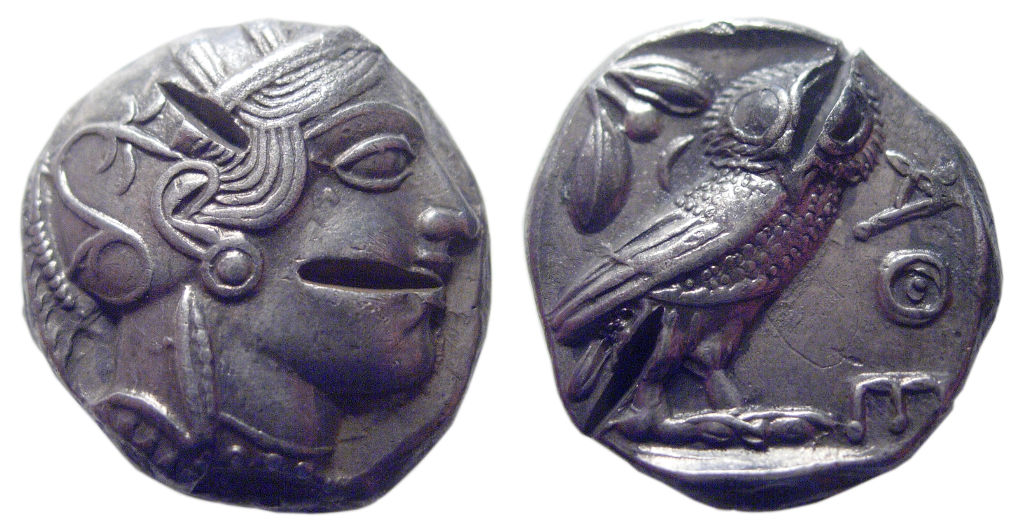
A tetradrachm from Ancient Athens, dated circa 449-413 BC. Contains multiple 'test cuts' which were commonly made by suspicious minds in antiquity to detect forgeries by assessing whether the base metal underneath was the same (silver) or a cheaper metal (e.g. bronze). This coin has silver beneath and is not an ancient forgery.

Both scarce 1923-D and 1930-D dimes were found in circulation, and they are of interest to collectors since no such date-mint combinations were issued for this particular denomination. It has been suggested that they may have been part of an attempt by the Soviet Union to sell its silver on the world market by counterfeiting (with full precious metal weight) U.S. coins. If so, the engravers blundered by producing "impossible" coins.

Among the examples of counterfeits of high-value collectible coins are the "Omega" coins produced in the early 1970s by an unknown counterfeiter who signed his creations with a miniature Greek letter omega, and so came to be known as the Omega man. He is believed to have made over 20,000 fake 1907 high-relief nominally US$20 gold Double Eagle coins with the signature omega in the claw of the eagle, worth hundreds of millions of dollars at today's prices. His counterfeits are of such high quality that collectors will pay upwards of $1,000 for one; although a genuine coin sells for about $50,000 to $100,000. The same counterfeiter also counterfeited other US gold coins, including a large quantity of $3 gold pieces, dated 1874, 1878 and 1882, with the 1882 being the most prevalent. Three of the counterfeit $10 gold pieces, the 1910-P, the 1913-P and the 1926-P, have the omega placed upside down within the upper loop of the "R" of "LIBERTY" in the Native American's headdress.

An American counterfeiting coin mold. The coin mold would come with two halves that would be lined with clay to make an impression of a genuine coin, then molten lead would be poured into the mold and the fake coin later plated with a thin layer of silver. Legitimate U.S. coins were made by government mints and stamped from silver or gold coin discs as most counterfeit coins were molded.

== See also ==
- Counterfeit coin problem
- Counterfeit money
- Evasion (numismatics)
- Trevor Ashmore
- Cliché forgery
