= Teslin (material) =

Waterproof synthetic paper

Teslin is a waterproof synthetic printing medium manufactured by PPG Industries. Teslin is a single-layer, uncoated film, and extremely strong. The strength of the lamination peel of a Teslin sheet is 2–4 times stronger than other coated synthetic and coated papers. Available thicknesses run from 6 to 18 mils (150 to 460 micrometres). Also available are perforated versions, specifically, 1up, 2up, 3up, 6up, and 8up.

Teslin is commonly used for producing waterproof maps, door hangers, flash cards, horticultural tags, parking permits, and more.

Teslin is also widely used in the plastic gift and loyalty card industry.

== Teslin Grades ==
There are various grades of Teslin available, each with their own use case depending on printing method and end use. Most grades of Teslin can be used with an offset press, but other types of printing require their own grades to ensure compatibility. Teslin grades are referred to as a letter and number designation (e.g. "SP 1000"). The letters are the type of Teslin, and the numbers represent the thickness where 1000 is 10 mils (250 μm), 600 is 6 mils (150 μm), 700 is 7 mils (180 μm), etc.
