= Authentics Foundation =

International NGO

The Authentics Foundation is an international non-governmental organization that raises public awareness of counterfeits.

On 10 March 2008 The Authentics Foundation hosted the Fakes Cost More summit in Brussels, Belgium, to launch an international campaign against counterfeit goods. European Commission President José Manuel Durão Barroso opened with a speech discussing the economic, social and health risks associated with counterfeits. Supermodel Yasmin Le Bon and actress Alice Taglioni endorsed the movement, telling media that the human cost of fakes is far higher than most consumers believe. Valerie Salembier, Senior VP/Publisher Harper's Bazaar spoke about her magazines highly successful Fakes are Never in Fashion campaign, which informs readers about the hidden costs of fakes—including child labor.
