= Eduardo de Valfierno =

Argentine con man alleged to have masterminded the theft of the Mona Lisa

Eduardo de Valfierno, who posed as a marqués (marquis), was supposedly an Argentine con man who allegedly masterminded the theft of the Mona Lisa in 1911. There are serious doubts as to whether or not he existed.

== Theft of the Mona Lisa ==
In 1932, journalist Karl Decker published a story in the Saturday Evening Post claiming Valfierno paid several men to steal the work of art from the Louvre, including museum employee Vincenzo Peruggia. On August 21, 1911 Peruggia hid the Mona Lisa under his coat and simply walked out the door. Before the heist took place, Valfierno allegedly commissioned French art restorer and forger Yves Chaudron to make six copies of the Mona Lisa. The forgeries were then shipped to around the world, readying them for the buyers he had lined up. Valfierno knew once the Mona Lisa was stolen it would be harder to smuggle copies past customs. After the heist the copies were delivered to their buyers, each thinking they had the original which had been stolen for them. Because Valfierno wanted to sell forgeries, he only needed the original Mona Lisa to disappear and never contacted Peruggia again after the crime. Eventually Peruggia was caught trying to sell the painting. It was returned to the Louvre in 1913.

Peruggia denied he ever knew Valfierno other than a chance meeting at the Louvre.

Decker's article is the only source for this story or even for the existence of Valfierno and Chaudron. He was famous for taking liberties with his articles, and many of the facts and details he provides in the article are incorrect, including the size and weight of the Mona Lisa and the type of wood it was painted on. That and the fact that a century later none of the alleged copies have been found casts serious doubts on the accuracy of the story and the existence of Eduardo de Valfierno.

== In fiction ==
The notion of stealing the Mona Lisa and making six copies to sell to private collectors is similar to a plot element in the Doctor Who story "City of Death": Through time travel, Leonardo da Vinci is forced to make copies of his own work, which would then be sold in 1979.

In the 1985 television series The Adventures of Sherlock Holmes starring Jeremy Brett, "The Final Problem" episode begins with the theft of the Mona Lisa, masterminded by Moriarty to sell prepared fakes to collectors. Holmes recovers the original painting just before Moriarty makes a sale to a "Mr. Morgan". Holmes's interference with his plans convinces Moriarty that the detective must be eliminated.

This con was mentioned in Leverage episode "The Two Live Crew Job", where a rival crew steals a painting that the Leverage Crew was looking for. Parker claims that this "Mona Lisa Variant" was the first con she learned and explains it for the viewing audience.

In the film St Trinian's (2007), the girls use a similar scheme with the painting Girl with a Pearl Earring: They make a copy, "borrow" the original, sell the copy for £500 000, return the original (claiming to have found it in a Harvey Nichols changing room) and claim the £50 000 reward. In a deleted scene, they mention the original "Mona Lisa scam".

In the psychological heist film Inception, Hotel Valferno is where the characters meet and fight.

In the USA Network show White Collar, an episode "Copycat Caffrey" was mainly about the same basic con that Valfierno pulled.

One of the plot revelations of the 1978 novel The Perfect Thief by Ronald Bass is that the character Voleur used this con, stealing a Goya painting so he could sell 32 forgeries to various buyers. The novel does not reference the original con by name.

The Argentine novelist Martin Caparros published in 2004 the novel Valfierno, in which he reconstructs in fictional form the biography of the con man, as well as those of his accomplices and the historical milieu.

Valfierno is the main character of the 2011 novel Stealing Mona Lisa, which is a fictional account of the theft by Carson Morton.

In the heist film The Art of the Steal the story of de Valfierno is a significant plot point in the story.

Aaron Elkins' 2018 art-world mystery A Long Time Coming begins with a significant recounting of the Valfierno story.

== See also ==
- Art forgery
- Mona Lisa
- Leonardo da Vinci
