= Adolf Burger =

Jewish Czech typographer, memoir writer, and Holocaust survivor (1917–2016)

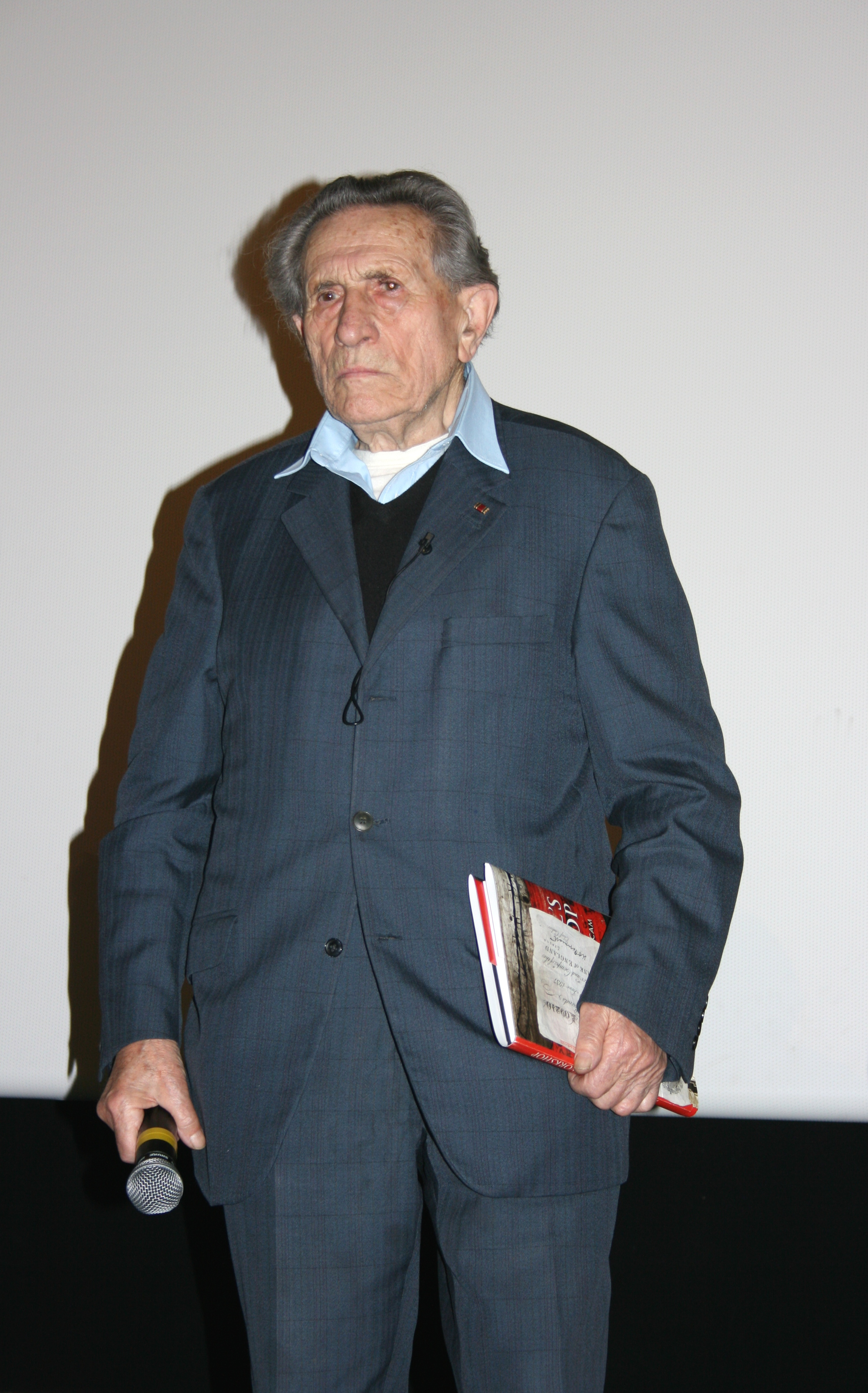
- Burger in Paris, 2008
- Born: 12 August 1917; Gross Lomnitz, Zipser County, Austria Hungary
- Died: 6 December 2016 (aged 99); Prague, Czech Republic
- Education: typography apprenticeship
- Occupations: typographer Nazi prisoner counterfeiter printing plant director
- Known for: memoirs on Operation Bernhard
- Political party: Communist Party
- Spouses: Gizela (born 1920, died 1942); Anna (died c. 2004)
- Children: 3

Adolf Burger (12 August 1917 – 6 December 2016) was a Czech Jewish typographer, memoir writer, and Holocaust survivor involved in Operation Bernhard. The film The Counterfeiters, based largely on his memoirs, won the 2007 Academy Award for Best Foreign Language Film.

== Life ==
Adolf Burger was born to a Jewish family in Gross Lomnitz, then a mostly ethnic German village in the High Tatras region, Spiš County. His father died when Adolf was 4½, after which his mother, four siblings, and two grandparents moved to the nearby town of Poprad. He entered apprenticeship with a local printer and typesetter at the age of fourteen. His mother remarried a Christian, which gave her the status of a non-Jew in Slovakia after the introduction of anti-Jewish laws by the beginning of World War II. The organization Hashomer Hatzair helped Burger's siblings to immigrate to the British Mandate of Palestine before Adolf Hitler's plan to exterminate the Jews materialized.

Adolf Burger did not join them and took up a job in a printing house in Bratislava in 1938. During World War II, before Slovakia started to deport its Jewish citizens to German concentration camps in 1942, he became one of those who received government-sponsored waivers from deportations as someone with skills indispensable for the country's economy. At the request of resistance members, Burger began to print false baptismal certificates for Jews scheduled for deportation, which stated that they had been Roman Catholic from birth, or baptized so before World War II. Slovaks with such documents were not deported.

Burger's activity was discovered. He was arrested on 11 August 1942, seven months after his marriage to his wife Gizela. Following his arrest, the couple were deported to the Auschwitz concentration camp where Gizela was killed later that year. He was assigned to work at the new arrivals selection ramps.

After eighteen months at Auschwitz-Birkenau, Burger's training came through for him once more. He was selected for Operation Bernhard, transferred to the Sachsenhausen concentration camp in April 1944, and eventually to the Ebensee site of the Mauthausen camp network where he was liberated by the US Army on 6 May 1945.

Upon returning to the place of his mother's residence at Poprad, Burger found out that, although exempt from deportation by Slovak law, she and his Christian stepfather had only months earlier been deported and killed. The application of the law changed when the German military took control of his country after the failed uprising of 1944. He then settled in Prague where he reconfirmed his membership in the Communist Party, which he joined in 1933, was made director of a consortium of printing houses, remarried, and had three children. He was harassed by the secret police during the Communist purges of the early 1950s. He later worked in a shipyard, headed a department in Prague's municipal services, and became director of the city-sponsored taxicabs.

He died on 6 December 2016 at the age of 99.

== Operation Bernhard memoirs ==
Burger's manuscripts were written in a mixture of Czech and Slovak, and adjusted by editors for publication in standard Czech. Versions of his memoirs were reedited and republished several times in a variety of languages (including German, Hungarian, Persian, and Slovak) and under modified titles.

His experiences as a currency counterfeiter working on a secret Nazi project in a German concentration camp were first made public in 1945 under the title Number 64401 Speaks (Číslo 64401 mluví) written by Sylva and Oskar Krejčí, who based their book on Burger's narrated recollections and included the photographs of the former prisoners he was able to take immediately after liberation. Adolf Burger began to rewrite his memoirs himself in the 1970s. He explained his motivation in an interview:

When I was liberated by the Americans I went home very calmly, never had a bad dream [...] For years I was silent, I didn't want to speak about this any more. It was only when the neo-Nazis started with their lies about Auschwitz that I began [...].

His memoirs were published in 1983 as The Commando of Counterfeiters (simultaneously in Czech Komando padělatelů and in a Slovak translation Komando falšovateľov), which was translated and published in East Germany in the same year under the now-familiar title The Devil's Workshop (Des Teufels Werkstatt: Im Fälscherkommando des KZ Sachsenhausen). The English language edition of the book was published by Frontline Books (London) in February 2009. Adolf Burger visited London to launch the book, with events at East Finchley's Phoenix Cinema and Jewish Book Week. He visited the Bank of England on Tuesday 24 February and met the Chief Cashier, Andrew Bailey. He was given a tour of the bank and the museum and presented with one of the notes which he had forged in the concentration camp more than sixty years earlier.

Screenwriter and director Stefan Ruzowitzky adapted the book as the screenplay for his Austrian-German co-production The Counterfeiters that received a foreign-language Oscar in 2008. Burger checked every draft of the screenplay. Adolf Burger is played by the German actor August Diehl. He is one of only two prisoner characters in the film that has an authentic historical name and is not synthesized from several real-life prisoners involved in Operation Bernhard (the other is the opera singer, Isaak Plappler who also was still living when the film was made).

== Bibliography ==
- In Czech:
  - 1945, written by Sylva and Oskar Krejčí, Číslo 64401 mluví. Prague.
  - 1983, Komando padělatelů. Prague. (translated into English as The Devil's Workshop: A Memoir of the Nazi Counterfeiting Operation. London: Frontline Books, 2009)
  - 1991, Ďáblova dílna: V padělatelském komandu koncentračního tábora Sachsenhausen. Prague.

== See also ==
- Adolfo Kaminsky, Jewish forger who remained active for left-wing causes after the Holocaust.
