= Adolph Otto =

German printer

Adolph Otto was a printer of Gustrow, Mecklenburg-Schwerin who printed the first stamps of Transvaal of 1870.

Later, Otto printed additional stamps from the original plates for sale to dealers for his own profit. He also applied fake cancels to the stamps and prepared new plates without permission to print additional stamps for his own benefit. The practices only stopped after he was visited by an official of the Transvaal government in 1882 and plates and stamps were seized. The forged stamps were sold through the Hamburg dealer Julius Goldner.

== See also ==
- Postage stamps and postal history of Transvaal
