= Giovanni Poggi (historian) =

Italian historian

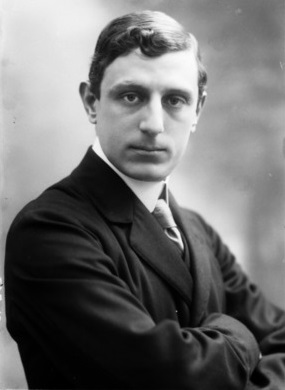
- Poggi c. 1910
- Born: 11 February 1880; Florence, Italy
- Died: 27 March 1961 (aged 81)

Academic background
- Education: Istituto di studi superiori di Firenze

Giovanni Poggi (11 February 1880 – 27 March 1961) was an Italian historian and museum curator.

== Life ==
Born in Florence to Luigi and Assunta Papini, he graduated in literature from the Istituto di studi superiori di Firenze in 1902 and dedicated his life to archival research and study of the arts, which remained central to his work throughout his life. He began his career as an official for antiquity and fine arts following the passing of state law number 185 ("Conservation of monuments, art objects and antiquities") on 12 June 1902. From 1904 onwards he was inspector extraordinary to the Regie Gallerie in Florence then director of the Museo Nazionale del Bargello from 1906 onwards and of the Uffizi from 1912 onwards. He also founded and co-edited the Rivista d'arte.

In 1913 he managed to recover the Mona Lisa, stolen from the Louvre two years earlier. It had been stolen by Vincenzo Peruggia who hoped to sell it and got in touch with Poggi, who in turn contacted the Florentine art dealer Alfredo Geri to verify the work's authenticity.

Poggi also put in place a plan to protect and safeguard Florence's artworks after Italy's entry into the Second World War in 1940, identifying several safe locations to host the objects and thus ensuring they remained undamaged by bombing and out of reach of Nazi looting. He retired in 1949 after reaching the age limit for his roles but the Comune di Firenze decided it wished him to continue overseeing the institutes and monuments relating to his own subject areas. He died in Florence in 1961.

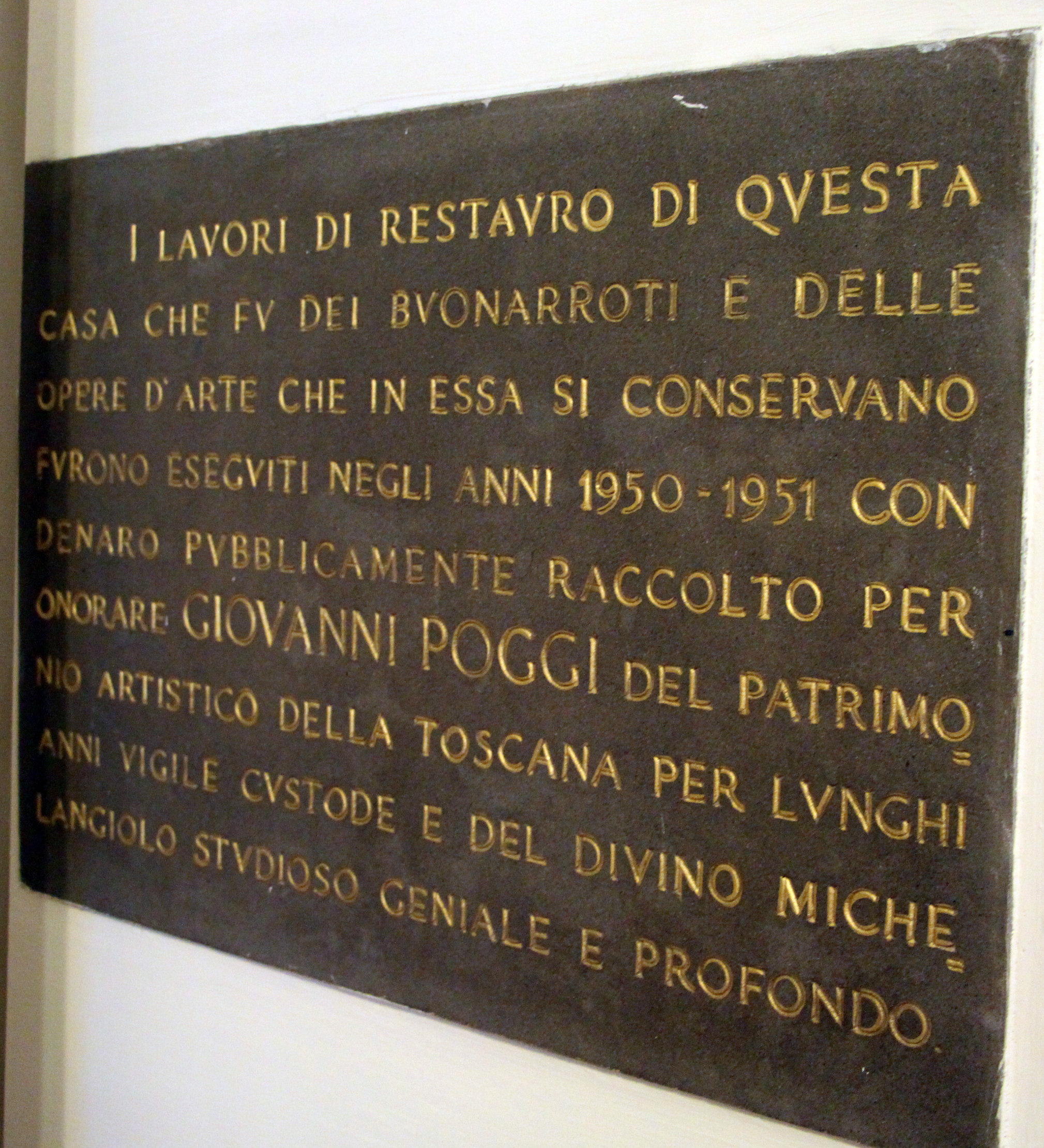
Casa Buonarroti, plaque commemorating Poggi's restoration, 1951

== Selected works ==
- "Un tondo di Benedetto da Maiano, Bollettino d'Arte, 1, 1908" (PDF).
