= Black Admiral =

Painting of a sailor

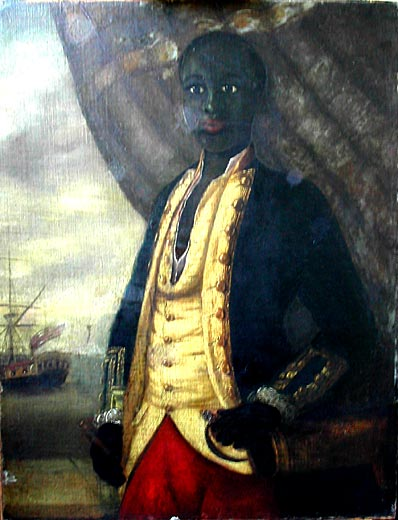
The "Black Admiral". The pale spots are areas where solvents were applied.

"Black Admiral" is the colloquial name for a Revolutionary War-era U.S. painting of unknown provenance that appears to depict a black man in U.S. naval uniform. In 2006, it was revealed that this 18th-century painting was merely a white sailor overlaid in the mid-to-late 20th century with African features.

The painting has often been featured in U.S. books and exhibitions on African-American history and the American Revolution, as it was thought to show a real black sailor, possibly belonging to a crew that had evacuated General George Washington from Long Island after the Battle of Brooklyn. For example, the painting appears in Gary B. Nash's book The Unknown American Revolution (2005), where it is identified as Black Privateer, ca. 1780, with the caption: "This black sailor very likely served on a privateer that took many enemy prizes, because only his share of the prize money would have allowed him to dress in such finery" (p. 227).

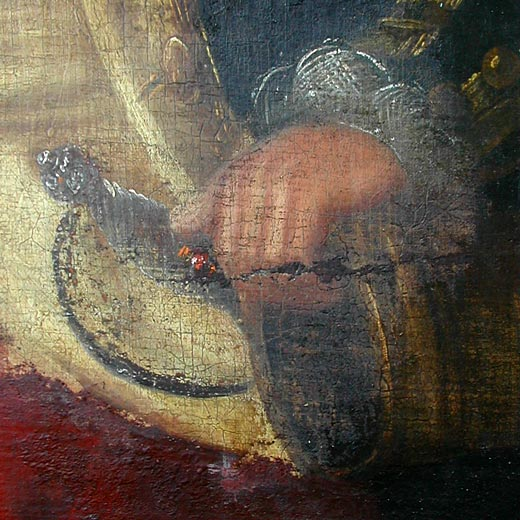
Detail of the left hand of the "Black Admiral" after restoration.

In 2006, however, the painting's owner, Alexander McBurney, decided to have it restored before lending it to the Fraunces Tavern Museum as the centerpiece of its “Fighting for Freedom: Black Patriots and Loyalists” exhibition. McBurney had purchased the painting from an art dealer in 1975 for $1,300, and before restoring it had it assessed for insurance purposes at $300,000. He hired Peter Williams, an art conservator, for the task. The restoration revealed that the sailor in the original painting was actually white, but had been painted over, probably sometime in the early 1970s. The alteration was probably intentionally fraudulent, according to Williams, because steps were taken to obscure the freshness of the changes. The painting's estimated market value has plummeted to $3,000, and McBurney decided to have it "restored" to the appearance of the Black Admiral and keep it as a family keepsake.
