= Louis-Henri Mercier =

Louis-Henri Mercier, whose real name was Henri Goegg, was a stamp forger operating from Geneva, Switzerland, whose business formed the foundation for the much more successful forger François Fournier.

Goegg commenced his business in 1890, having registered his trademark with the Swiss authorities on 27 August. He specialised in reproductions of old Swiss stamps which he called reimpressions. He stated in his advertising that "The reimpressions are printed one at a time on plates carefully prepared, and on paper of the period of the originals, which is deceiving to the eye of the greatest connoisseur and most expert. All these stamps are cancelled."

In 1894 Goegg registered a new trademark under the name Louis-Henri Mercier, possibly so as to fit in better in French-speaking Geneva and that was the name he used thereafter.

Although Mercier's forgeries were of high quality, his business was not financially successful and eventually he became bankrupt. François Fournier purchased Mercier's stock from the Office of Bankruptcy in 1904 and used it to start his own forgery business.

Fournier boasted of the medals his stock had won in international philatelic competitions, however, those awards had in fact been won by Mercier for his work and included six crosses of merit, one insignia of honour, eight gold medals, four grand prizes and six diplomas of honour. At the time, medals were still awarded for facsimiles, although now they would be ineligible and would be seen simply as forgeries.

== See also ==
- List of stamp forgers
- Philatelic fakes and forgeries

== References and sources ==
Notes

Sources

- Tyler, Varro E. (1976). Philatelic Forgers: Their Lives and Works. London: Robson Lowe Ltd. ISBN 0-85397-052-1.
