= Julius Goldner =

German stamp forger

Julius Goldner (c. 1841/42 – 14 January 1898) was a nineteenth-century wholesale stamp dealer in Hamburg known for producing large quantities of "reprints" (described by contemporary sources as forgeries) of the stamps of Hamburg and other states.

Goldner started in 1868 by paying a postal official to apply a departure stamp cancel to a quantity of Hamburg remainders which were then sold as postally used stamps. He then moved on to producing private "reprints" of the stamps of Hamburg, Heligoland, and Bergedorf. He was also the principal outlet for the forgeries of Transvaal produced by Adolph Otto. He produced forgeries of the stamps of Ecuador and Romagna in the 1890s.

Goldner's business practices, while now regarded as unethical or outright criminal, were more acceptable in the early days of philately when clear ethical guidelines had not been established. In noting Goldner's death, Charles Phillips described him as an "esteemed confrere" with whom the firm of Stanley Gibbons had dealt for over twenty years, noting that he dealt in "common stamps in very large quantities" and singling out the "millions" of Heligoland "reprints" produced by Goldner.

Goldner was survived by his wife, and his son Ludwig, who continued the business under the same name.
