= The Counterfeiters (2007 film) =

2007 Austrian-German film by Stefan Ruzowitzky

- Theatrical release poster
- Directed by: Stefan Ruzowitzky
- Written by: Stefan Ruzowitzky
- Based on: The Devil's Workshop: A Memoir of the Nazi Counterfeiting Operation by Adolf Burger
- Produced by: Josef Aichholzer; Nina Bohlmann; Babette Schröder
- Starring: Karl Markovics; August Diehl; Devid Striesow; Marie Bäumer
- Cinematography: Benedict Neuenfels
- Edited by: Britta Nahler
- Music by: Marius Ruhland
- Production companies: Aichholzer Film; Magnolia Filmproduktion; Babelsberg Studio
- Distributed by: Filmladen (Austria); Universum Film (Germany)
- Release dates: 22 March 2007 (Germany); 23 March 2007 (Austria)
- Running time: 98 minutes
- Countries: Austria; Germany
- Languages: German; Russian; English; Hebrew
- Budget: $6.25 million
- Box office: $20.2 million

The Counterfeiters (German: Die Fälscher) is a 2007 Austrian-German drama film written and directed by Stefan Ruzowitzky. It fictionalizes Operation Bernhard, a secret plan by Nazi Germany during World War II to destabilize the United Kingdom by flooding its economy with forged Bank of England pound notes. The film centres on a Jewish counterfeiter, Salomon 'Sally' Sorowitsch, who is coerced into assisting the operation at the Sachsenhausen concentration camp.

The film is based on the 1983 Czech-language memoir Komando padělatelů ("The Commando of Counterfeiters") by Adolf Burger, which was published in English as The Devil's Workshop. Burger was a Jewish Slovak typographer who was imprisoned in 1942 for forging baptismal certificates to save Jews from deportation and was later interned at Sachsenhausen to work on Operation Bernhard. Ruzowitzky consulted closely with Burger through almost every stage of the writing and production. The film won the 2007 Best Foreign Language Film Oscar at the 80th Academy Awards.

== Plot ==
The film begins shortly after the end of the Second World War with a man arriving in Monte Carlo. After checking into an expensive hotel and paying with cash, he takes in the high life of Monte Carlo, successfully gambling in a casino and attracting the attention of a beautiful French woman. Later, she discovers tattooed numerals on his arm, revealing him as a survivor of the Nazi concentration camps.

The film then flashes back to Berlin in 1936, where the man, Salomon Sorowitsch, is revealed as a successful forger of currency and passports. Caught by the police, he is imprisoned, first in a labour camp, then in Mauthausen concentration camp near Linz. In an effort to secure himself protection and meagre comforts at the camp, he turns his forging skills to portraiture, attracting the attention of the guards, who commission him to paint them and their families in exchange for extra food rations.

Sorowitsch's talents bring him wider attention, and he is transferred out of the concentration camp. Brought in front of the police officer who arrested him in Berlin, he finds himself put together with other prisoners with artistic or printing talents and begins working in a special section of the Sachsenhausen concentration camp devoted to forgery. The counterfeiters are kept in relatively humane conditions, with comfortable bunks, a washroom and adequate food, although their guards continue to subject them to brutality and insults. His fellow prisoners have a range of backgrounds from Jewish bank managers to political agitators, and while some are content to work for the Nazis to avoid the extermination camps, others see their efforts as supporting the German war effort.

At first, self-preservation appears to guide Sorowitsch, but his motives for forging for the Nazis are complicated by his growing concern for his fellow prisoners, his awareness of their role in the wider war against the Nazis, and his professional pride in counterfeiting the US dollar, a currency he was previously unable to forge.

Sorowitsch juggles the Nazi demands for progress, his co-counterfeiters' determination to sabotage the operation, and his loyalties to his fellow prisoners. The prisoners successfully counterfeit the British pound but intentionally delay the forgery of the US dollar. Gradually, the inmates discern slivers of evidence that the war has turned decidedly against the Nazis. One day the camp guards suddenly announce that the printing machines are to be dismantled and shipped away, which leads the counterfeiters to fear that they will finally be killed. Before anything happens to them, the German guards flee the camp in advance of the Red Army. Starving prisoners from other parts of the camp, armed with confiscated weapons, take over and break into the compound where the counterfeiters had been held in relative luxury. Until the insurrectionists see the well-fed printers' prison tattoos, they believe them to be SS officers and threaten to shoot them. The counterfeiters then must account for their forging actions to the half-dead prisoners.

The film then returns to post-war Monte Carlo, where Sorowitsch, apparently disgusted by the life he is now leading on the currency that he forged for the Nazis, intentionally gambles it all away. Sitting alone afterward on the beach, he is joined by the French woman, concerned after his seemingly disastrous losses at the table. Dancing slowly together on the beach, she continues to remark on all the money he has lost, to which he replies, laughing, "We can always make more".

== Cast ==
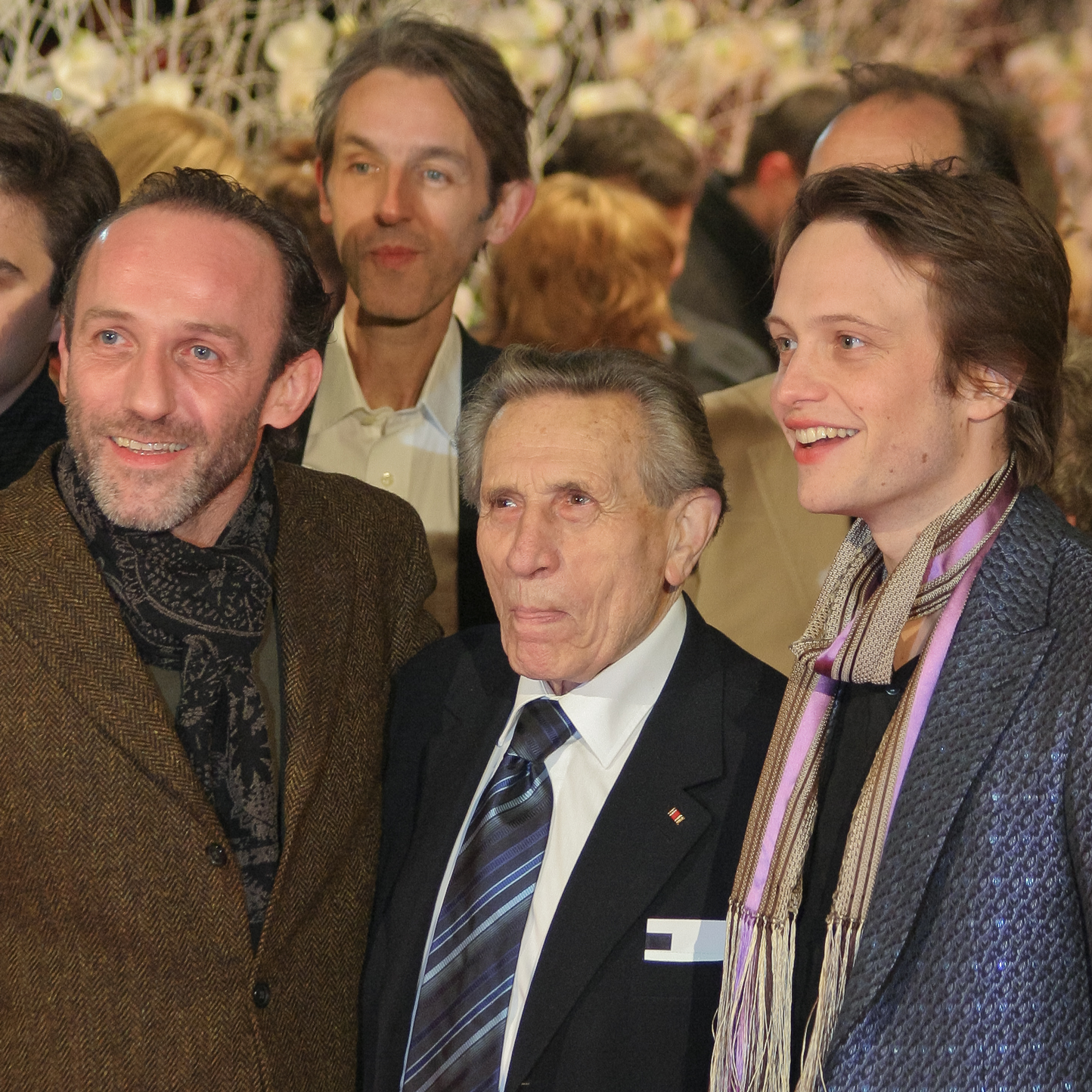
Karl Markovics, Andreas Schmidt, Adolf Burger, and August Diehl at the Premier of The Counterfeiters at the 57th Berlin International Film Festival

- Karl Markovics as Salomon Sorowitsch (Salomon Smolianoff)
- August Diehl as Burger (Adolf Burger)
- Devid Striesow as Sturmbannführer Herzog (Bernhard Krüger)
- Martin Brambach as Hauptscharführer Holst
- August Zirner as Dr Klinger
- Veit Stübner as Atze
- Sebastian Urzendowsky as Kolya
- Andreas Schmidt as Zilinski
- Tilo Prückner as Hahn
- Lenn Kudrjawizki as Loszek
- Marian Kalus as Plappler
- Norman Stoffregen as Abramovic
- Hille Beseler as Grete Herzog
- Marie Bäumer as Aglaia
- Arndt Schwering-Sohnrey as Hans
- Jan Pohl as Sascha
- Werner Daehn as Rosenthal

== Production ==
Except for the score music by Marius Ruhland, the soundtrack consists of classical tangos recorded decades ago by Argentine harmonica player Hugo Díaz, and opera recordings from the 1930s and 1940s.

== Reception ==
=== Critical response ===
The Counterfeiters holds a score of 78/100 on Metacritic, based on 23 critics, indicating "generally favorable reviews". The Counterfeiters has an approval rating of 93% on review aggregator website Rotten Tomatoes, based on 126 reviews, and an average rating of 7.8/10. The website's critical consensus states, "The Counterfeiters is a gripping account of one prisoner's moral dilemma, superbly portrayed by Karl Markovics". The film appeared on some critics' top ten lists of the best films of 2008. Josh Rosenblatt of The Austin Chronicle named it the 4th best film of 2008, and Ella Taylor of LA Weekly named it the 8th best film of 2008. On the other hand, some believed that the film might play into the hands of anti-Semites due to the stereotypes against Jews. The director was aware of the risk posed by such stereotypes.

=== Accolades ===
- Academy Awards 2007 (24 February 2008)
  - Won Best Foreign Language Film
- Berlin International Film Festival, 2007
  - Nominated for Golden Bear award: Stefan Ruzowitzky
- German Film Awards, 2007
  - Won Best Performance by an Actor in a Supporting Role: Devid Striesow
  - Nominated for Best Cinematography: Benedict Neuenfels
  - Nominated for Best Costume Design: Nicole Fischnaller
  - Nominated for Best Performance by an Actor in a Leading Role: Karl Markovics
  - Nominated for Best Production Design: Isidor Wimmer
  - Nominated for Best Screenplay: Stefan Ruzowitzky
  - Nominated for Outstanding Feature Film: Nina Bohlmann, Babette Schröder, Josef Aichholzer
- Film Fest Gent, 2007
  - Won Grand Prix for Best Film

== Home media ==
The Counterfeiters was released (with English subtitles) on DVD and Blu-ray Disc in the United Kingdom by Metrodome Distribution on 17 March 2008, and in the US by Sony Pictures Home Entertainment on 5 August 2008.

== See also ==
- Private Schulz, a BBC production covering the same events.
