= Robert Thwaites =

Robert Thwaites is a former graphic designer from the United Kingdom who gave up work due to failing eyesight in the late nineties. He turned to faking Victorian paintings in order to put his son through private school. Without any formal training he sold two paintings including one to an Antiques Roadshow expert. He was caught out while trying to sell a third. He was sentenced to two years in prison on 19 September 2006.
