= Yves Chaudron =

French art forger

Yves Chaudron was a supposed French master art forger who is alleged to have copied images of Leonardo da Vinci's Mona Lisa as part of Eduardo de Valfierno's famous 1911 Mona Lisa painting theft. In reality he may be a fictional character created by Karl Decker for an article that ran in a 1932 issue of the Saturday Evening Post, and passed off as a real person. There is also very little evidence that Valfierno actually existed, or if he did, that he was involved in the theft of the Mona Lisa at all.

== Theft of the Mona Lisa ==
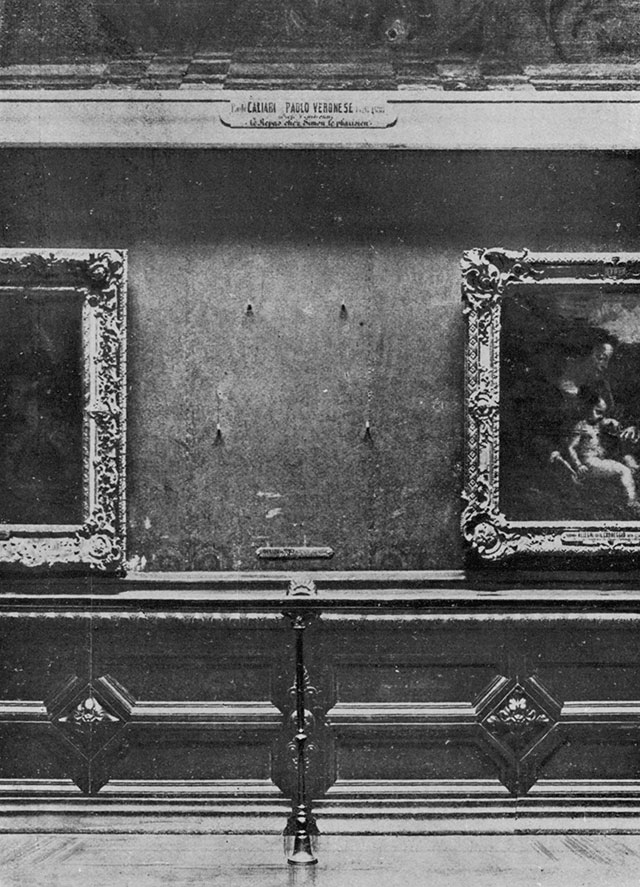
The Mona Lisa's vacant space at The Louvre after its theft in 1911.

Valfierno's account was relayed by reporter Karl Decker, in the Saturday Evening Post's “Why and How the Mona Lisa Was Stolen,” June 25, 1932.' According to Decker, Valfierno had provided details of the theft in confidence; to be published only after his death.

According to that account, in 1910, Valfierno had conspired with Chaudron to steal the Mona Lisa and produce copies of the painting which would then be sold to private buyers as the genuine painting. The plan had been to sell each copy as the "original" while the location of the real painting was unknown.

Chaudron, "spent the winter of 1910 creating clones of Leonardo's great portrait" while Valfierno made arrangements to steal the real painting. In the early hours of 21 August 1911, Louvre employee Vincenzo Peruggia and two accomplices carried the Mona Lisa out of the museum covered in a painter's smock.

== Chaudron's copies ==
Decker asserts that six Chaudron copies had already been sent to the United States ahead of the theft and while the stolen original remained in France, Valfierno followed his fakes and sold each for up to US$300,000. The original remained hidden for two years until Peruggia, presenting himself as Leonardo Vincenzo, tried to sell it in Florence, Italy. A museum administrator there was suspicious, reported the attempted sale and Peruggia was arrested. The original Mona Lisa was returned to the Louvre in 1913.

More than 100 years later, none of these six paintings has ever surfaced, bringing into question if they ever in fact existed. Further, the only evidence that the "famed forger" Yves Chaudron even existed is Karl Decker's 1932 Saturday Evening Post article. There are no known photos of the man or relatives or any biographical details outside of this incident. None of his other forged works has ever come to light, and it is quite impossible to be a 'famed forger' if none of your forgeries is discovered. Decker's entire 1932 article may be a work of fiction that, much like forgeries in the art world, has fooled many who have read it.

== Later life ==
According to Valfierno's account, the mysterious Chaudron retired to the countryside only months after the theft and the completion of the forgeries. He is said to have continued to produce forgeries of other artists' work, but never to the same scale as his work related to the Mona Lisa theft. Again, no works by Chaudron, forged or otherwise, have ever been located. As Valfierno's account was only released in 1932 (some years after the supposed death of Chaudron), there was no arrest or trail of the mysterious forger and his role in the theft was effectively unknown during his lifetime, only being revealed in the 1932 article. Yves Chaudron was most likely a creation of Karl Decker that fit well into a story of a criminal mastermind and his associates, that readers of the article assumed was genuine. His name still pops up in lists of the top forgers of the 20th century, despite there being no forged works of art found that can be attributed to anyone named Chaudron.

== See also ==
- Art forgery
- Mona Lisa
- Louvre
- Leonardo da Vinci
- City of Death (a Doctor Who story about creating six Mona Lisa copies, then stealing the original in order to sell the copies to six buyers)
