= Edward Emery =

English numismatist and forger

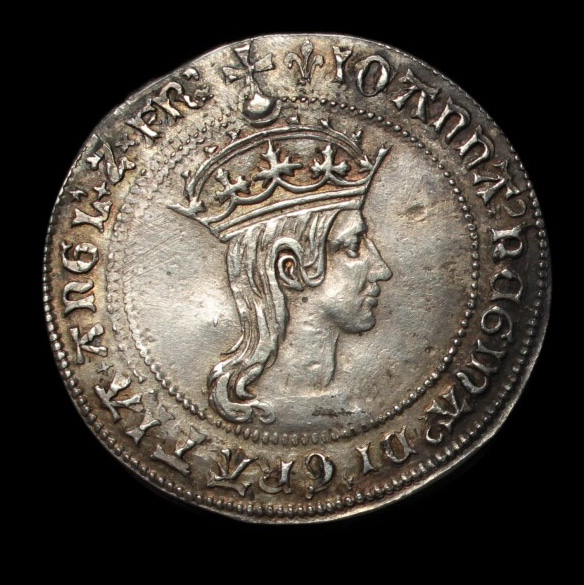
Silver fantasy coin of Queen Jane, dated 1553, by Emery

Edward Emery (died c. 1850) was an English numismatist, responsible for the creation of forged coins.

== Life ==
Emery was a coin-collector and coin-dealer living in London. He is said to have belonged to a respectable family, and to have been prosperous. After 1842, he is believed to have left London in debt. In June 1848, the young numismatist John Evans understood that Emery was working with a dealer named Singleton to sell forgeries. He was reported to have died at Hastings about 1850, but some doubt was cast on this in later research by H. E. Pagan, who could find no suitable death at Hastings. He tentatively identified the forger as Edward Emery, a plate glass factor, who occupied premises in Kirby Street, London, in the late 1830s and early 1840s, and who died at 96, High Holborn, on 6 June 1851, aged 49. That Edward Emery is recorded at 96 High Holborn in the 1851 United Kingdom census, taken on 31 March. He is noted as a 49-year old native of Plymouth, while his wife Martha’s place of birth is given as Soho. They had three children living with them, aged between twelve and 26. Edward Emery married Martha Nurthen, a widow, at Marylebone, on 31 August 1823.

== Forgeries ==
Under Emery's direction notorious imitations of coins known as ‘Emery's forgeries’ were produced. He engaged an engraver to manufacture dies of rare English and Irish coins, and some of the specimens struck off from these dies sold for large sums. The forgeries were in the market during the summer of 1842, but they were exposed in The Times and in the Numismatic Chronicle. Before the end of that year Emery (or his engraver) was obliged to surrender the dies, which were then cut through the centre and rendered useless.

Emery's forgeries are: penny of Edward VI, with portrait; shillings of Edward VI with false countermarks of portcullis and greyhound; jeton or coin of Lady Jane Grey as queen of England; half-crown and shilling of Philip and Mary; gold ‘rial’ of Mary I; groats and half-groats of Mary I (English and Irish), and probably others. The forgeries are clever, but the lettering is not successful.
