= Robert Spring =

Robert Spring (1813–1876) was an English-born forger who forged letters from luminaries like George Washington, Benjamin Franklin and Horatio Nelson.

Robert Spring was born in England but there is no information about his life prior to his emigration to the United States. He settled in Philadelphia, Pennsylvania, around 1858 and became an antiquarian and bookseller.

Sometime in the 1870s, Spring began to forge letters from historical people like Washington and Franklin. He used his own mixture of special ink on contemporary paper. At first, he used sheets of paper he had cut from the fronts or backs of old books.

Spring created numerous forgeries of letters, payment orders and other papers with forged signatures of George Washington. He wrote the first payment orders on printed forms of the Office of Discount and Deposit at Baltimore. He made numerous copies of an autographed pass through American lines, issued with numerous different names - sometimes that of the intended buyer. Another common forgery was a supposed letter to one Jabez Huntington, a sheriff of Windham, Connecticut, that was an order to release a prisoner held in the county jail - with varying dates and names. He probably produced those to order in large quantities.

Sometimes Spring acquired genuine documents, traced them to make copies, "aged" them with coffee grounds and sold them as original. He could send the forged letters to collectors who were interested in old letters or signatures, add a note that the sender needed money and give a poste restante address. He would receive $5–25 at the time, but his supply of such letters was not easily exhausted.

In 1858, Spring was arrested in Philadelphia for receiving money under false pretenses. He skipped bail and moved to Canada. He began to send his forged letters while pretending to be an impoverished widow who had to sell her family papers. All of them had signatures of important historical personages.

Sometime in the 1860s, Spring returned to the United States, settled in Baltimore and began to offer his forgeries to British autograph collectors. He posed as a daughter of Thomas J. "Stonewall" Jackson who would have to sell family papers in hard times. Many of the counterfeit letters were sold in Canada and Britain.

In 1869, Spring was arrested again in Philadelphia and put to trial. He confessed and was sent to prison.

Robert Spring died on December 14, 1876, in a Philadelphia charity hospital.

There are still numerous papers in public repositories and private collections in the United States and Europe that might be Spring's work. Proven Spring forgeries have become collector's items in their own right.
