= Counterfeit Coin Bulletin =

American publication, 2000 to 2002

The Counterfeit Coin Bulletin was a publication of the American Numismatic Association, released three times a year to help battle counterfeiting of collector coins. Issued on a subscription basis, the bulletin was produced in conjunction with the International Association of Professional Numismatists (IAPN), which operates the International Bureau for the Suppression of Counterfeit Coins (IBSCC) and maintains close links with mints, police forces, museums, collectors and coin dealers.

Eight issues were produced between April 2000 and December 2002, after which the ANA ceased publication.

The publication was previously known as the Bulletin on Counterfeits, and was published out of Switzerland by the IBSCC.

As of November 30, 2006, The entire series of The IBSCC Bulletin on Counterfeits was incorporated into forgerynetwork.com with permission from the copyright holder.
