= François Fournier (stamp forger) =

Swiss-French stamp forger (1846–1917)

Francois Fournier

François Fournier (24 April 1846 – 12 July 1917) was a stamp forger. He thought of himself as a creator of "art objects" .

Fournier was born in Croix-de-Rozon, Switzerland, but became a French citizen and served in the army during the Franco-Prussian War in 1870/71.

== Facsimile business ==
Fournier did not become involved with the philatelic business until later life.

In about 1903 he returned to Switzerland and settled in Geneva, where in May 1904 he bought the stock of Louis-Henri Mercier, real name Henri Goegg, who had gone bankrupt. It is at about this time that Fournier began his business producing facsimile stamps.

The business grew rapidly, and from 1910 to 1913 Fournier produced his own journal and price list, Le Fac-Simile. He claimed agents in 23 countries and in 1913 stated that he had 10,000 approval customers and 10,000 catalogue customers. His last price list in 1914 shows 3,671 different stamps for sale, although not all were his own creations.

At first Fournier was on good terms with stamp dealers and philatelic societies. However, as his business grew and his facsimiles started to be passed off as the real thing by unscrupulous dealers and collectors, a backlash developed against him, and he found his wares banned by dealers and his advertising blocked. The creation of Le Fac-Simile in 1910 was one way of obtaining publicity for his business, and it was said that up to 25,000 copies of each edition were distributed. The journal was also Fournier's personal platform through which to air his grievances and to rail against his treatment by the mainstream stamp trade and particular individuals in it.

== The Philatelic Clinic ==
Fournier also operated a "Philatelic Clinic" which employed five "restorers" to repair damaged stamps. The work included removing specimen overprints from high-value British colonial stamps and regumming. The removal of pen cancels was a speciality.

== Fournier's philosophy ==
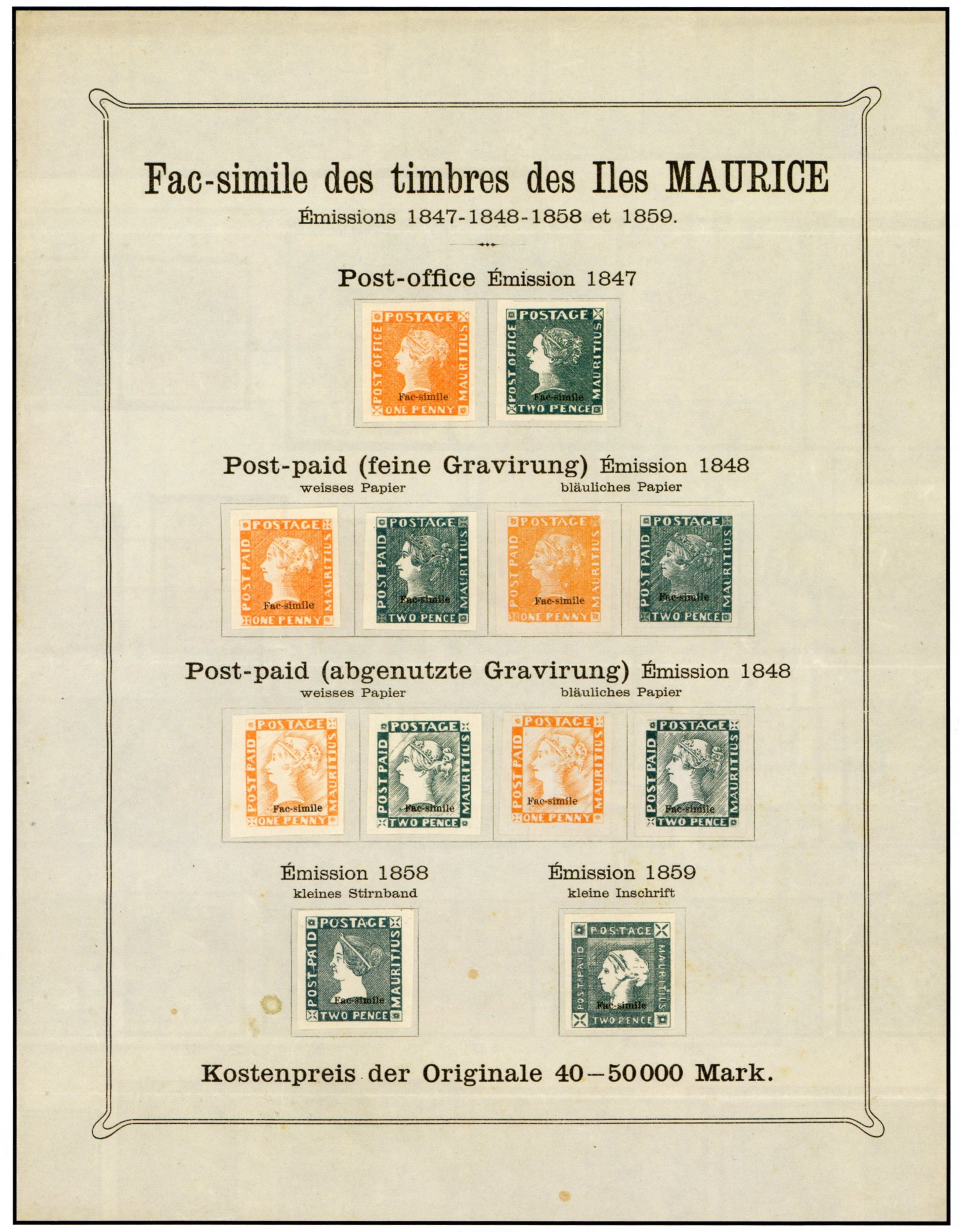
A page of Fournier "facsimiles" of Mauritius.

Fournier was a man who was stated to be unfairly treated, but was unable to accept any criticism. He was a collector of modest means who could not afford the high prices demanded by dealers for the great philatelic rarities. Fournier was happy to help these collectors fill gaps in their printed albums with an expertly produced facsimile at a fraction of the price of the real thing. He always pointed out that he only produced facsimiles of stamps from dead countries or of items that were no longer valid for postal use. This ignored, however, the possible subsequent misrepresentation of his work as genuine.

Consistent with his philosophy, and somewhat hypocritically, Fournier roundly condemned the reprinting of stamps and sale of remainders by governments as swindles against the collector which destroyed the value of the originals. He claimed that "Le Fac-Simile is the only stamp journal exposing speculators and their exploits."

There is no evidence that Fournier himself passed off any of his work as other than a facsimile. However, he always resisted attempts to identify his work as facsimiles by overprinting, marking on the reverse or any other method. We cannot know whether Fournier was simply naive about the purpose to which his work could be put, or just chose to turn a blind eye to the obvious possibilities for fraud.

Fournier was never convicted of any criminal offence.

== Death and disposal of his materials ==
The mailing restrictions and censorship of World War I caused major problems for Fournier's business, with consignments seized and postal communications disrupted. His health, already poor, declined further, and he died in 1917. He was buried at his birthplace, Croix-de-Rozon.

One of his employees, Charles Hirschburger, attempted to continue the business but ultimately was unsuccessful. He died in 1927 and the Union Philatelique de Genève bought the remaining stock and equipment from Hirschburger's widow in order to prevent it falling into the wrong hands. There were forgeries weighing over 800 pounds, as well as gummed stamp sheets ready for printing and the actual printing equipment. Much had been damaged by storage in damp conditions. The equipment was donated to the Geneva Museum of History. The forged stamps were printed with the words Faux and/or Facsimile. Students from the Geneva School of Arts and Crafts were employed to create 480 representative albums of Fournier's work which were sold to stamp dealers, collectors and others in 1928. In addition, the Union prepared a more extensive five-volume collection of Fournier's work for its library. The remaining stock was burned on 15 September 1928, under the supervision of the Bailiff of the Canton of Geneva.

== See also ==
- List of stamp forgers
