= Fourrée =

Coinage plated with a precious metal

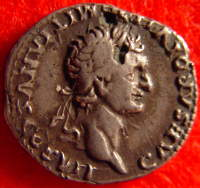
A fourrée denarius of Domitian, showing two points of breakage in the plating.

A fourrée (pl. fourrées; also spelt without the accent, with one R, and with one E) is a coin, usually counterfeit, that is made from a base metal core that has been plated with a precious metal or alloy to look like its solid metal counterpart; the term is derived from the French word for "stuffed". Most fourrées had a base metal of bronze plated with silver and gold but were also made with other base metals and also plated from alloys such as electrum.

Production of fourrées began since coinage was first minted in Asia Minor in the 7th century BC, which were made from plated electrum. But when Greece and Rome started producing their own coinage, silver and gold fourrées became more common. Today fourrées are still made, although not to deceive people.

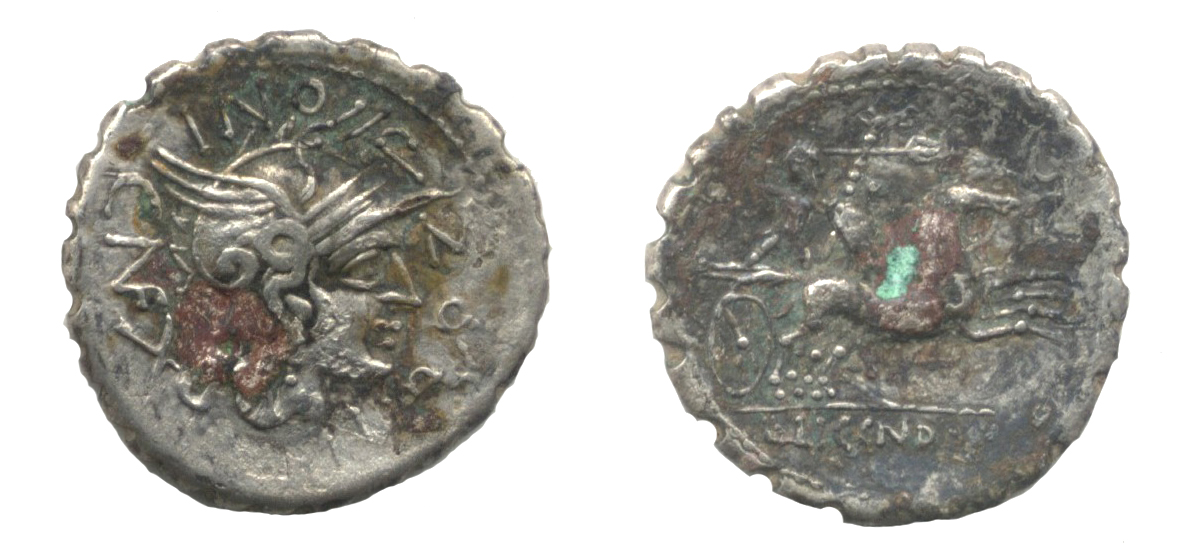
A fourrée denarius of L. Pomponius, L. Licinius Crassus, and Cn. Domitius Ahenobarbus, moneyers in 118 BC. The copper core is more visible in the obverse, and is also an example of a serrati.

The earliest known way of detecting fourrées was through making "test cuts", but later "banker marks" and serrated edges (serrati) became more common. Cicero mentions that M. Marius Gratidianus, a praetor during the 80s BC, was widely praised for developing tests for detecting false coins and removing them from circulation. Gratidianus was killed under Sulla, who introduced his own anti-forgery law (lex Cornelia de falsis) that reintroduced serrated edges on precious metal coins, an anti-counterfeiting measure that had been tried earlier. Serrated denarii, or serrati, feature about 20 notched chisel marks on the edge of the coin, and were produced to demonstrate the integrity of the coin. But the effort was in vain, as examples of fourrée serrati attest.

The Latin term for a silver-plated copper coin is subaeratus and the Greek term is ὑποχάλκος (hypochalkos), both meaning "copper below".

== Production ==
Production of fourrées began almost as early as the production of the first coins in Lydia in the 7th century BC. These coins were produced by people wishing to profit by producing a counterfeit containing less precious metal content than its purported face value. The most common method for producing a fourrée was to take a flan of copper, wrap it with silver foil, heat it, and strike it with the dies. If the coin was sufficiently heated and struck hard enough, a layer of eutectic alloy (a mixture of 72% silver and 28% copper that has the lowest melting point of any mixture of these two metals) would be produced, fusing the layers together. Sometimes eutectic was sprinkled between the layers to increase the bond. Exposure of the deception was often due to wear at the high points of the coin, or moisture trapped between the layers that caused the foil to bubble and then break as the core corroded.

A later method for making fourrées involved adding silver to the base metal coin after it had been struck. This method allowed even less silver to be used, which became more important in order to make counterfeiting profitable as the official coinage was debased. The exact method by which these coins were silvered is unclear, although possible methods include dipping the coin in molten silver, brushing the coins with molten silver, or dusting the coin with powdered silver and heating it until the silver melted.

In peripheral regions, even cruder counterfeits might pass: in the Viking-age site in Coppergate, in York, a forgery of an Arab dirham was found, struck as if for Isma'il ibn Achmad (ruling at Samarkand, 903-07/8), of copper covered by a once-silvery wash of tin.

== Detection ==
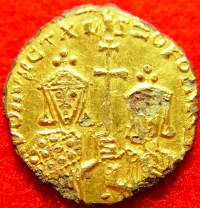
Obverse of a Byzantine fourrée solidus, depicting Romanos I Lekapenos (left) and his son Christopher Lekapenos (right).

The easiest way to spot a fourrée is by weight, since a fourrée with a copper core would weigh noticeably less than a solid metal coin due to the lower density of copper. The opposite would also be true for a fourrée with a lead core.

Another method to determine whether a coin was plated was listening to the sound produced by dropping the coin onto a hard surface. This was done because if the coin was, for example, solid silver, it would have a distinctive ring. Although this was done by contemporary merchants, it is not recommended that this method be used on ancient coins today since the coin could potentially be damaged, especially since over time silver coins can become brittle if the silver begins to recrystallize.

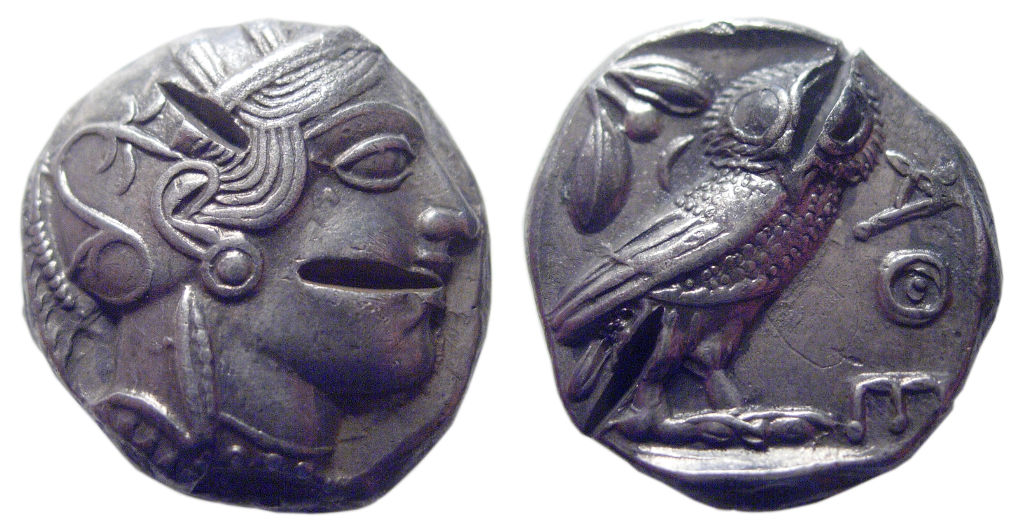
A tetradrachm from Classical Athens, dated to c. 449-413 BC, which contains multiple "test cuts"

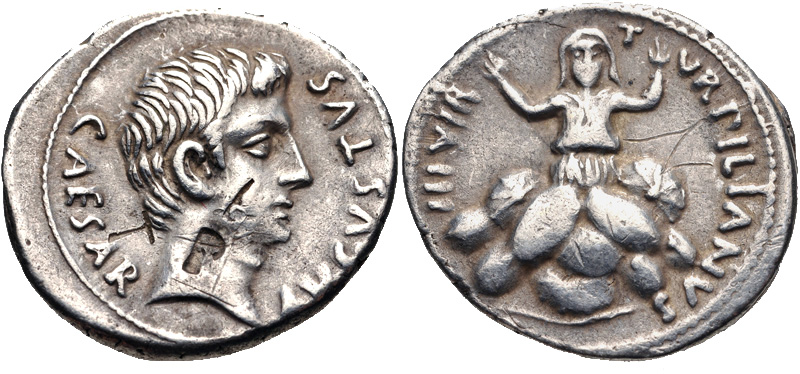
A denarius of Augustus with "banker marks" around his head on the obverse

The most obvious way to detect a plated coin would be if the base metal core was damaged or worn, revealing the base metal. One way of doing it was by doing "test cuts", common in Ancient Greek coinage. But later on throughout the centuries serrated edges and "banker marks" became more common, done by merchants attempting to determine if a coin was solid metal. "Banker marks" are symbols, sometimes representing letters, that are stamped onto the coin. They are most common on Roman denarii of the late 2nd century BC-1st century AD.

During the Crisis of the Third Century, constant wars required a lot of coins to be produced, leading to heavy debasing of precious metal coinage. The antoninianus was eventually debased to the point where the flans (blank metal disks) were produced with 5% of silver or less, and were pickled to dissolve the copper from the surface and produce a spongy surface of almost pure silver. When these coins were struck, the force of striking would produce a thin shiny layer of silver on the surface, which usually quickly wears away. These "silvered" coins are not considered fourrées, since they are not actually plated since the metal is actually a continuous layer and these coins were not created to deceive people.

== Modern examples ==
Of modern coins, the clad US quarter dollar is an example of a coin which is not a fourrée, it is made of two layers of copper nickel, with copper "sandwiched" in between and therefore is not a plated coin. The U.S. pennies since 1982 are an example of fourrées since they are made of zinc which has been plated with copper.

The Euro 1, 2 and 5-cent coins are copper-coated steel fourrées.
