= Operation Bernhard =

Exercise by Nazi Germany to forge British bank notes

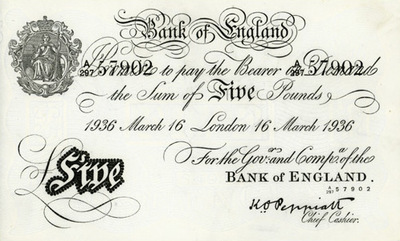
A £5 note (white fiver) forged by Sachsenhausen concentration camp prisoners

Operation Bernhard was an exercise by Nazi Germany to forge British bank notes. The initial plan was to drop the notes over Britain to bring about a collapse of the British economy during the Second World War. The first phase was run from early 1940 by the Sicherheitsdienst (SD) under the title Unternehmen Andreas (Operation Andreas). The unit successfully duplicated the rag paper used by the British, produced near-identical engraving blocks and deduced the algorithm used to create the alpha-numeric serial code on each note. The unit closed in early 1942 after its head, Alfred Naujocks, fell out of favour with his superior officer, Reinhard Heydrich.

The operation was revived later in the year; the aim was changed to forging money to finance German intelligence operations. Instead of a specialist unit within the SD, prisoners from Nazi concentration camps were selected and sent to Sachsenhausen concentration camp to work under SS Major Bernhard Krüger. The unit produced British notes until mid-1945; estimates vary of the number and value of notes printed, from £132.6 million up to £300 million. By the time the unit ceased production, they had perfected the artwork for US dollars, although the paper and serial numbers were still being analysed. The counterfeit money was laundered in exchange for money and other assets. Counterfeit notes from the operation were used to pay the Turkish agent Elyesa Bazna—code named Cicero—for his work in obtaining British secrets from the British ambassador in Ankara, and £100,000 from Operation Bernhard was used to obtain information that helped to free the Italian leader Benito Mussolini in the Gran Sasso raid in September 1943.

In early 1945 the unit was moved to Mauthausen-Gusen concentration camp in Austria, then to the Redl-Zipf series of tunnels and finally to Ebensee concentration camp. Because of an overly precise interpretation of a German order, the prisoners were not executed on their arrival; they were liberated shortly afterwards by the American Army. Much of the output of the unit was dumped into the Toplitz and Grundlsee lakes at the end of the war, but enough went into general circulation that the Bank of England stopped releasing new notes and issued a new design after the war. The operation has been dramatised in a comedy-drama miniseries Private Schulz by the BBC, in a 2007 film, The Counterfeiters (Die Fälscher) and in a fictionalised version in the 2026 film Peaky Blinders: The Immortal Man.

== Background ==
=== British paper currency ===
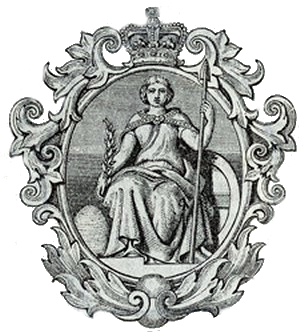
Vignette of Britannia that appeared in the top left of the British notes

The designs used on British paper currency at the beginning of the Second World War were introduced in 1855 and had been altered only slightly over the intervening years. The notes were made from white rag paper with black printing on one side and showed an engraving of Britannia by Daniel Maclise of the Royal Academy of Arts in the top left-hand corner. The £5, also known as the White Fiver, measured 7 11/16 in × 4 11/16 in (195 mm × 120 mm), while the £10, £20 and £50 notes measured 8 1/4 in × 5 1/4 in (210 mm × 133 mm).

The notes had 150 minor marks that acted as security measures to identify forgeries. These were often assumed to be printing errors, and were changed between issues of notes. (Note: One example of the marks in question was a small white dot in the i of the word five on a £5 note.) Each note bore an alphanumeric serial designation and the signature of the Chief Cashier of the Bank of England. Prior to the release of any notes by the Bank of England, all serial numbers were recorded in ledgers so the bank could verify its liabilities; these numbers were checked when the notes circulated back through the bank. (Note: The practice of recording the notes dated back centuries before the 1940s. The bank notes were originally released as a "receipt for coin", or promissory note.)

A watermark appeared across the middle of every note; it differed depending on the value of the currency and the alphanumeric serial designation used. According to John Keyworth, the curator of the Bank of England Museum, as the paper currency had never been successfully counterfeited, the Bank of England "was a little complacent about the design of its notes and the production of them"; he described the notes as "technologically ... very simple".

=== Origins of the plan ===
At a meeting on 18 September 1939 Arthur Nebe, the head of the Reichskriminalpolizeiamt—the central criminal investigation department of Nazi Germany—put forward a proposal to use known counterfeiters to forge British paper currency. The forged notes—amounting to £30 billion—would then be dropped over Britain, causing a financial collapse and the loss of its world currency status. Nebe's superior officer, Reinhard Heydrich, liked the plan, but was unsure of using the police files to find the available individuals. (Note: Heydrich was also the head of the International Criminal Police Organization (now known as INTERPOL), and was concerned that the use of the files of known criminals would discredit Germany's control over the organisation.) Joseph Goebbels, the Reich Minister of Propaganda, described it as "einen grotesken Plan", "a grotesque plan", although he saw it had potential. The main objection to the plan came from Walther Funk, the Reich Minister for Economic Affairs, who said it would breach international law. Adolf Hitler, the German Chancellor, gave the final approval for the operation to proceed. (Note: The journalist Lawrence Malkin, who wrote a history of Operation Bernhard, outlines a story that Hitler wrote in the margin of the proposal "Dollars no. We are not at war with the USA" and signed his name. Malkin relates that although the story has been repeated in a number of histories, there is no evidence that it is true, and the document has never been located.)

Although the discussion was supposed to be secret, in November 1939 Michael Palairet, Britain's ambassador to Greece, met a Russian émigré who gave him full details of the plan discussed at the 18 September meeting; according to the émigré's report, the plan was titled "Offensive against Sterling and Destruction of its Position as World Currency". Palairet reported the information to London, who alerted the US Department of the Treasury and the Bank of England. Although the Bank considered the existing security measures were sufficient, in 1940 it released a blue emergency £1 note which had a metal security thread running through the paper. It also banned the import of pound notes for the duration of the war in 1943, stopped producing new £5 notes and warned the public about the danger of counterfeit currency.

=== Operation Andreas ===
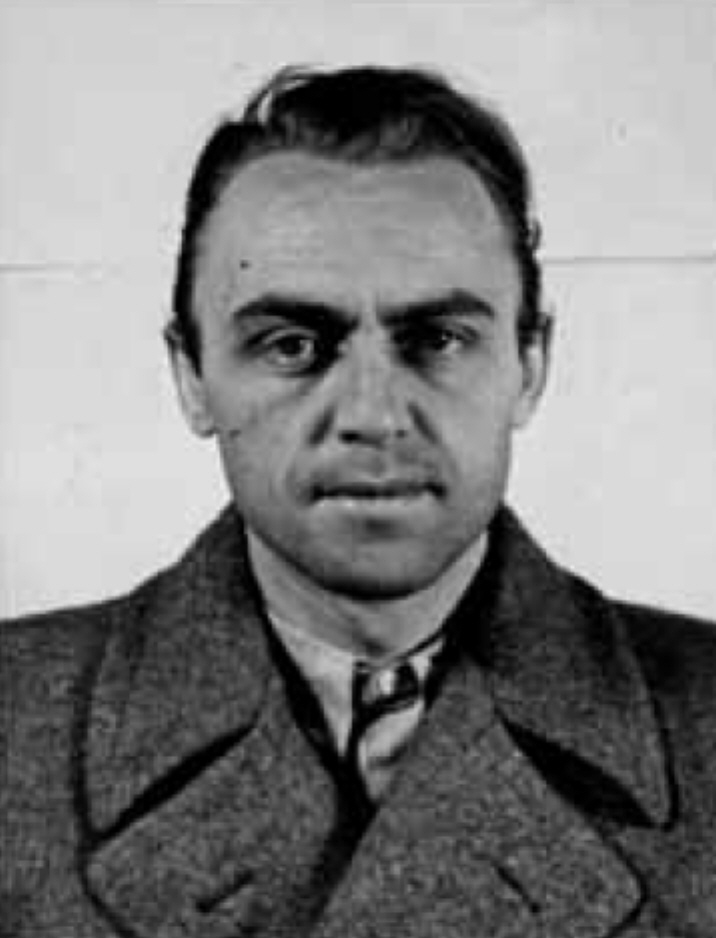
Alfred Naujocks, who oversaw Operation Andreas

On receipt of Hitler's go-ahead, Heydrich opened a counterfeiting unit under the operational title Unternehmen Andreas (Operation Andreas). (Note: Unternehmen Andreas is listed in histories as either Operation Andreas or Operation Andrew. The scheme was also known in Nazi command as Production A.) Heydrich's order to set up the unit stated that

This is not to be a forgery or counterfeiting in the usual sense, but authorised facsimile production. The notes must be such a perfect copy of the original that even the most experienced bank-note experts cannot tell the difference.

In early 1940 the forgery unit was set up in Berlin within the technical department of the Sicherheitsdienst (SD), headed by Alfred Naujocks, a major in the paramilitary Schutzstaffel (SS). Daily operational control fell under the auspices of Naujocks's technical director, Albert Langer, a mathematician and code-breaker. The pair broke the task down into three stages: producing identical paper, preparing identical printing plates to the British notes, and duplicating the British serial numbering system.

The Germans decided to concentrate on the notes with the largest number in circulation, the £5. Samples of British notes were sent to technical colleges for analysis, which reported back that it was rag paper with no added cellulose. Naujocks and Langer realised that the paper would have to be handmade. The colour of the first samples differed from the original; the Germans had used new rags. After tests at the Hahnemühle paper factory, the rags were used by local factories and then cleaned before being used to make the paper; the colours of the counterfeit and original notes then matched. When the initial paper samples were produced, at a factory in Spechthausen, they looked identical to British notes in normal light, but looked dull in ultraviolet light when compared to the originals. Langer surmised it was because of the chemical composition of the water used for making the paper and in the ink. He duplicated the chemical balance of British water in order to make the colours match.

To break the coded arrangement of the alphanumeric serial designation, Langer worked with banking experts, examining records of currency from the previous 20 years in order to replicate the correct order. No records were kept by Operation Andreas and how the Germans identified the correct sequences is not known; the paper historian Peter Bower states that it is possible that techniques adapted from those used in cryptanalysis were used to break the sequences. The German engravers working on the engraving plates struggled to reproduce the vignette of Britannia, which they nicknamed "Bloody Britannia" because it was so difficult. After seven months the forgers finished what they thought was a perfect copy, although Kenworthy states that the figure's eyes are incorrect.

By late 1940 Naujocks had been removed from his position after he fell out of favour with Heydrich. (Note: Sources disagree on the reasons for the falling out. The historian Anthony Pirie relates that Naujocks was running Salon Kitty, a brothel frequented by high-ranking Nazis and foreign dignitaries; he made a practice of recording Heydrich during his visits, until he found out. Malkin considers the breach between the two came because Heydrich ordered Naujocks to counterfeit a supply of Norwegian kroner within a week; Naujocks told him it would take a minimum of four months.) The counterfeiting unit continued under Langer before he left in early 1942 at which point it closed down; he later stated that over 18 months, the unit had produced around £3 million in forged notes; the historian Anthony Pirie puts the figure at £500,000. Most of the currency produced in Operation Andreas was never used.

== Revival under Krüger ==
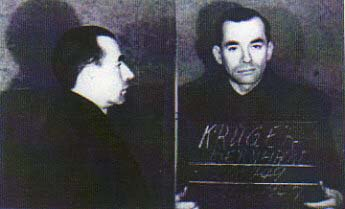
SS Major Bernhard Krüger, shown after his capture in 1946

In July 1942, following changes in the aim of the plan, Reichsführer Heinrich Himmler revived the operation. Whereas the original plan was to bring about the collapse of the British economy through dropping the notes over the UK, Himmler's new intention was to use the counterfeit money to finance German intelligence operations. The security services under Himmler's control were poorly funded, and the counterfeit funds were used to cover the financial shortfalls in revenue from the Reichsbank.

SS Major Bernhard Krüger replaced Naujocks; searching through the offices used daily by Operation Andreas, he found the copper engraving plates and the machinery, although some of the wire gauzes used to make the watermarks were bent. He was ordered to use the Jewish prisoners incarcerated in the Nazi concentration camps, and set up his unit in blocks 18 and 19 at Sachsenhausen. The blocks were isolated from the rest of the camp by additional barbed wire fences, and a SS-Totenkopfverbände unit was assigned as guards.

Krüger visited several other concentration camps to assemble the people he needed, primarily selecting those with skills in draftsmanship, engraving, printing and banking. In September 1942 the first 26 prisoners for Operation Bernhard arrived at Sachsenhausen; 80 more arrived in December. When met by Krüger, he called them in the formal and polite form Sie, rather than the more demeaning du, which was normally used when the Nazis spoke to a Jew. Several of the prisoners selected later reported that Krüger had interviewed them for the role, and treated them with politeness and good manners. He also provided the prisoners with cigarettes, newspapers, extra rations and a radio. Prisoners had a ping pong table, and they would play with the guards and among themselves; evenings of amateur theatricals also took place, staged by the prisoners, with a mixed audience of guards and counterfeiters; Krüger provided musicians for musical numbers.

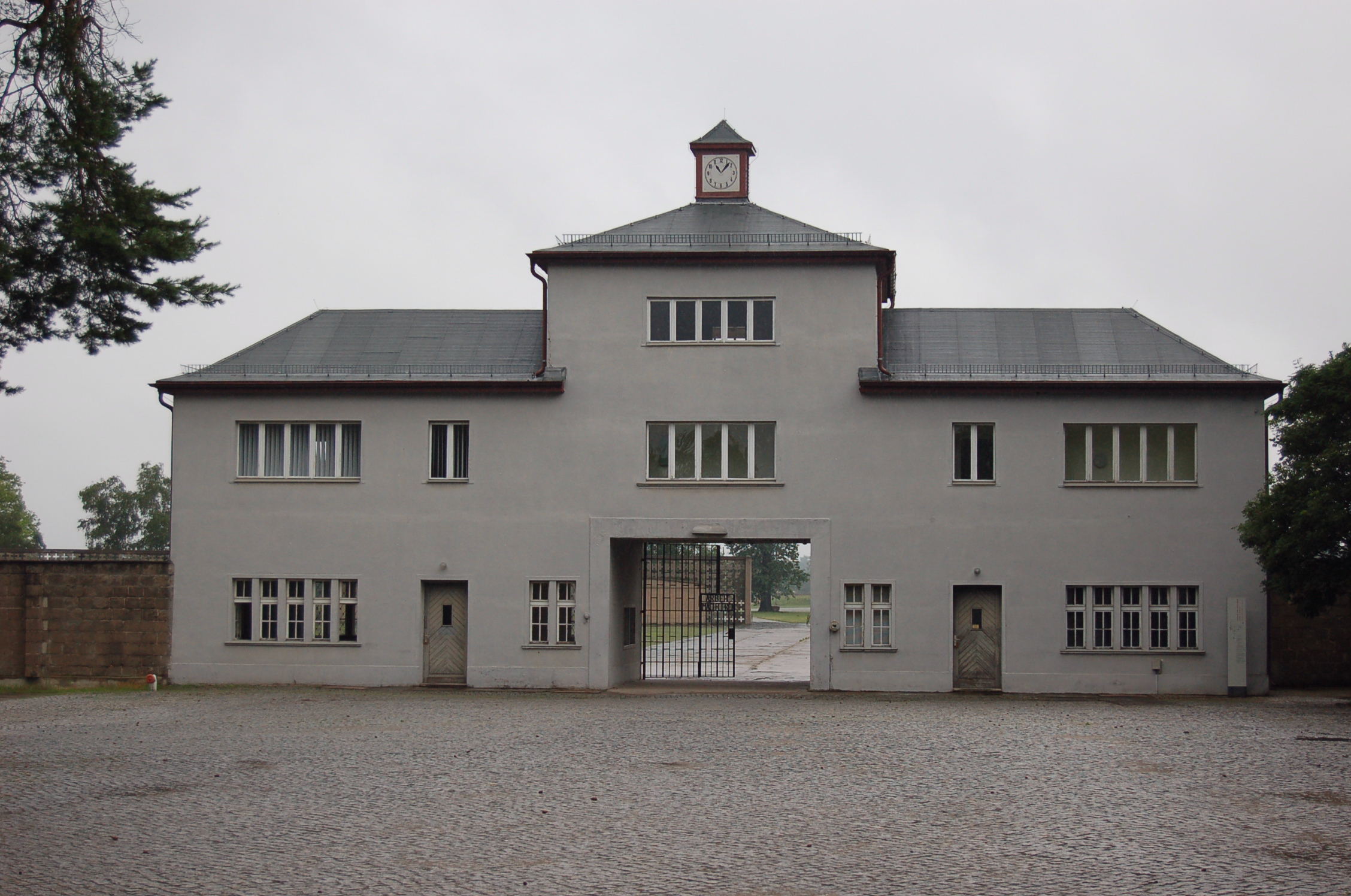
The entrance to Sachsenhausen concentration camp, where the forgers operated

The printing equipment was delivered in December, and 12,000 sheets of banknote paper a month began to arrive from Hahnemühle; it was large enough for four notes to be printed on each sheet. Production of counterfeit notes started in January 1943; it took a year for production to return to the levels achieved in Operation Andreas.

Each section of the process was overseen by one of the prisoners, and the day-to-day operations were run by Oscar Stein, (Note: The name is also given as Oskar Stein.) a former office manager and bookkeeper. Two twelve-hour shifts ensured non-stop production, with around 140 prisoners working. (Note: Some sources put the number of prisoners involved at nearly 300.) The printed sheets, each containing four notes, were dried and cropped using a steel ruler; the edges were roughened to imitate the deckle finish of the British notes. (Note: Deckle is a paper with a rough or slightly feathered edge.) The operation peaked between mid-1943 and mid-1944, with approximately 65,000 notes a month produced from six flat-bed printing presses.

To age the notes, between 40 and 50 prisoners stood in two columns and passed the notes among them to accumulate dirt, sweat and general wear and tear. Some of the prisoners would fold and refold the notes, others would pin the corners to replicate how a bank clerk would collect bundles of notes. British names and addresses were written on the reverse, as happened with some English notes, and numbers were written on the front – duplicating how a bank teller would mark the value of a bundle. Four grades of note quality were introduced: grade 1 was the highest quality, to be used in neutral countries and by Nazi spies; grade 2 was to be used to pay collaborators; grade 3 was for notes that were to be possibly dropped over Britain; grade 4 were too flawed to be of use and were destroyed.

The Nazi authorities were so pleased with the results of the operation that twelve prisoners, three of whom were Jewish, were awarded the War Merit Medal while six of the guards received the War Merit Cross, 2nd class.

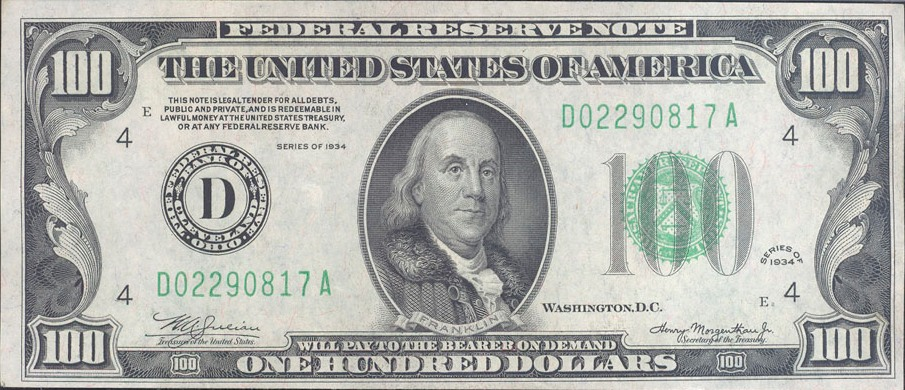
The US $100 note (obverse of the 1934 series pictured) was considered more difficult to counterfeit because of the complex artwork involved.

In May 1944 Ernst Kaltenbrunner, an SS Obergruppenführer (General of the branch) in the Reichssicherheitshauptamt (Reich Security Main Office; RSHA), ordered that the counterfeiting unit begin to produce forged US dollars. The artwork on the notes was more complex than that of the British currency and caused problems for the forgers. Additional challenges they faced included the paper, which contained minute silk threads, and the intaglio printing process, which added small ridges to the paper.

The prisoners realised that if they managed to fully counterfeit the dollars, their lives would no longer be safeguarded by the work they were undertaking, so they slowed their progress as much as they could. The journalist Lawrence Malkin, who wrote a history of Operation Bernhard, writes that prisoners considered this to have the tacit approval of Krüger, who would face front-line duty if Operation Bernhard ended. In August 1944 Salomon Smolianoff, a convicted forger, was added to the production team at Sachsenhausen to aid the counterfeiting of US dollars, although he also assisted in quality control for the pound notes. (Note: Bower gives the date of Smolianoff's arrival into Sachsenhausen as January 1943.) The Jewish prisoners working on the operation at the time complained to Krüger at having to work with a criminal, so he was given his own room to sleep in.

In late 1944 the prisoners had counterfeited the reverse of the dollar, and the obverse by January 1945. Twenty samples of the $100 note were produced—without the serial number, whose algorithm was still being examined—and shown to Himmler and banking experts. The standard of engraving and printing was considered excellent, although the paper used was technically inferior to the genuine notes. (Note: Dollar bills of the 1940s were half-linen, half-cotton with a transparency standard of 35 per cent; small pinpricks were visible in the paper when it was examined under a microscope. Under the late wartime conditions in which raw materials were growing scarce, it was not possible to produce an exact match for the paper.)

=== Laundering and use of the forged notes ===
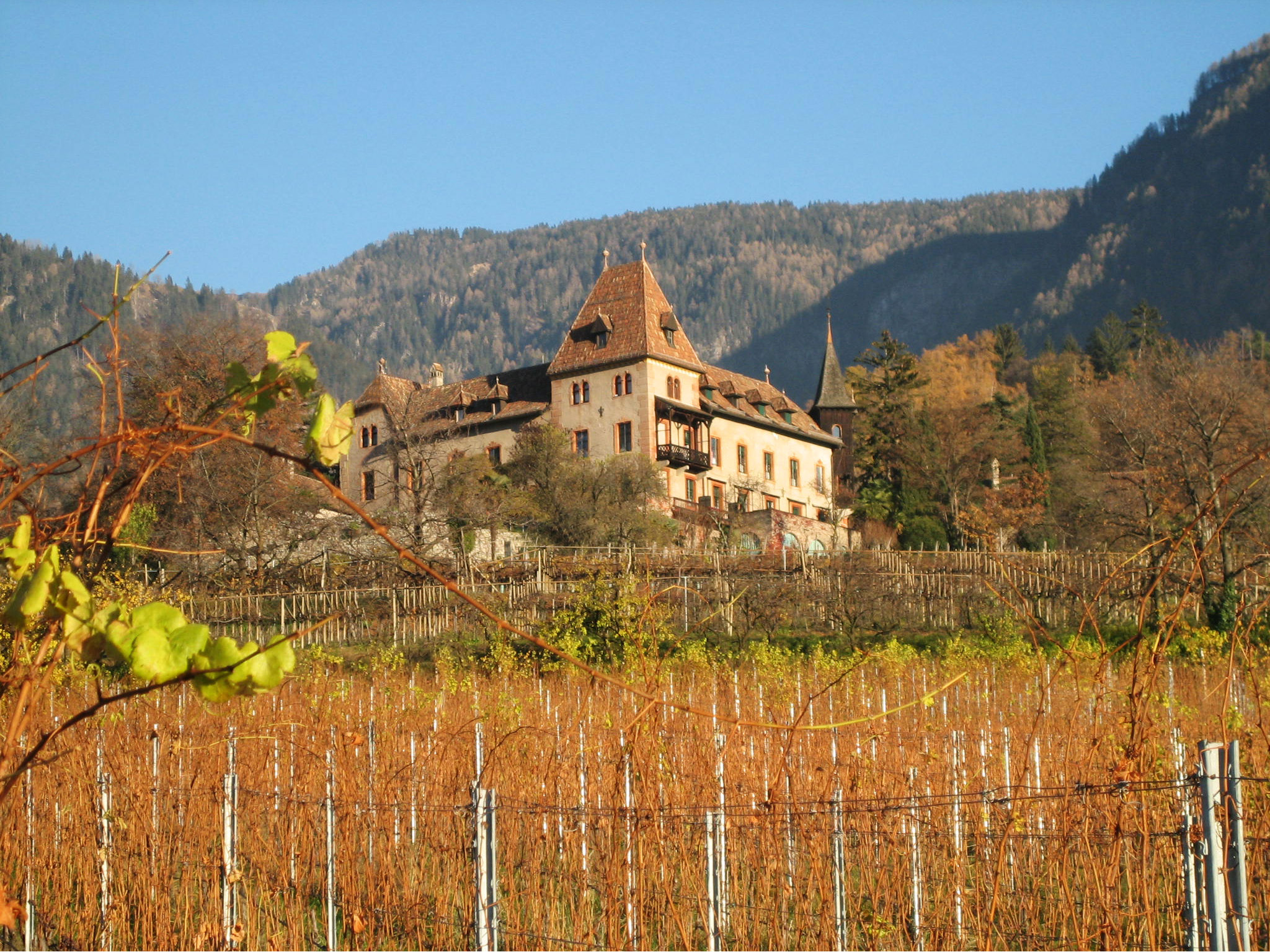
Schloss Labers, the SS-run facility where the money was stored

The counterfeit money was transported from Sachsenhausen to Schloss Labers, an SS-run facility in the South Tyrol. It was put through a money laundering operation run by Friedrich Schwend, who had been running an illegal currency and smuggling business since the 1930s. (Note: Schwend (sometimes given as "Fritz" and "Schwendt"), also worked under the aliases of Fritz Klemp and an SS major, Dr Wendig.) He negotiated a deal in which he would be paid 33.3% of the money he laundered; 25% was given to his agents undertaking the work—as payment to them and their sub-agents, and for expenses—leaving him with 8.3%. He recruited what he called "salesmen" in various territories, and built a network of 50 agents and sub agents; some of these were Jewish, deliberately selected because there was less chance that the authorities would consider them to be working for the Nazis. He informed his agents that the money had been seized from the banks of occupied countries.

Schwend was given two objectives: to exchange the counterfeit money for genuine Swiss francs or US dollars, and to assist with the funding of special operations, including buying black market arms from the Yugoslav Partisans then selling them to pro-Nazi groups in Southeast Europe. He also arranged for the counterfeit notes to pay the Turkish agent Elyesa Bazna—code named Cicero—for his work in obtaining secrets from the British ambassador in Ankara. (Note: Bazna realised the notes were forgeries after the war; he sued the West German government for compensation, lost, and died in poverty in Munich in 1970.) Counterfeit notes with a face value of £100,000 were used to obtain information that helped to free the Italian leader Benito Mussolini in the Gran Sasso raid in September 1943.

== Final stages of the war ==
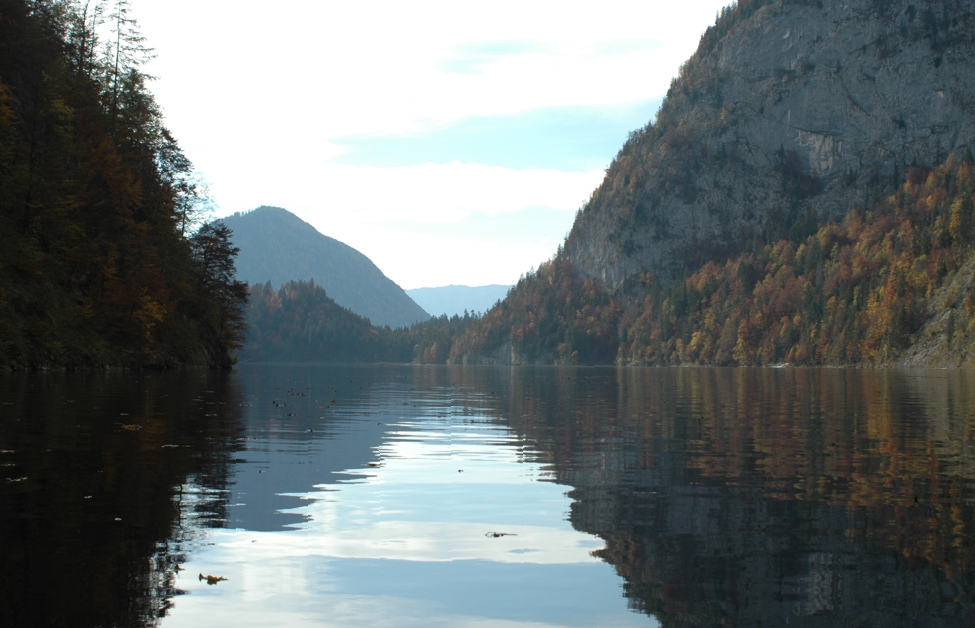
Lake Toplitz, Austria, where the SS dumped printing equipment and some of the currency

Between late February and early March 1945, with the advance of the Allied armies, all production of notes at Sachsenhausen ceased. The equipment and supplies were packed and transported, with the prisoners, to the Mauthausen-Gusen concentration camp in Austria, arriving on 12 March. Shortly afterwards Krüger arranged for a further transfer to the Redl-Zipf series of tunnels where they were to restart production. The order to resume production was soon rescinded, and the prisoners were ordered to destroy the cases of money they had with them. That which was not burnt by the prisoners was loaded onto trucks with the printing equipment and sunk in the Toplitz and Grundlsee lakes.

At the start of May, Operation Bernhard was officially closed down and the prisoners were transported from the caves to the nearby Ebensee concentration camp. They were divided into three groups, and a truck was to make trips to and from the camp. An order had been issued that the prisoners were to be killed, but only once they were together at Ebensee. The truck delivered the first two groups to the camp, where the men were housed separately from the general camp population. On the third journey the vehicle broke down after it had picked up the final group of prisoners; the men in the last group were marched to the camp, which took two days. As the order had specified that the prisoners had to be killed together, the first two groups were kept safe to await their comrades. Because of the delay with the third journey and the close proximity of the advancing Allied army, on 5 May the first two groups were released from their isolation into the general population and their SS guards fled. That afternoon the third group arrived at the camp. When the guards learned what had happened to the first two groups, they also released their prisoners into the main prison population and fled. The Americans arrived the following day and liberated the camp.

Estimates of the number and value of notes printed during Operation Bernhard vary from a total of £132,610,945 (of which £10,368,445 were sent to the RSHA central office), up to £300 million (of which £125 million were usable notes).

== Aftermath and legacy ==
Krüger hid at his home until November 1946 when he handed himself over to the British authorities. As forging an enemy's currency was not a war crime, he faced no charges. He was detained until early 1947 when he was handed over to the French. They attempted to persuade him to forge passports for them, but he refused; he was released in November 1948. He underwent a denazification process, during which statements were produced from the forger-inmates whose lives he had been responsible for saving. He later worked for the Hahnemühle paper company. In 1965 the East German writer Julius Mader published Der Banditenschatz, an attack on the West German government for harbouring Krüger.

Schwend amassed a fortune from Operation Bernhard. He was captured by American forces in June 1945, who tried to use him to assist in setting up a counterintelligence network in Germany, the Gehlen Organization. After he was caught trying to defraud the network, he fled to Peru. Although he periodically acted as an informant for Peruvian intelligence, he was arrested for currency smuggling and selling state secrets. After a two-year prison sentence, he was deported to West Germany where he was tried for a wartime murder in 1979; he was given a suspended sentence for manslaughter.

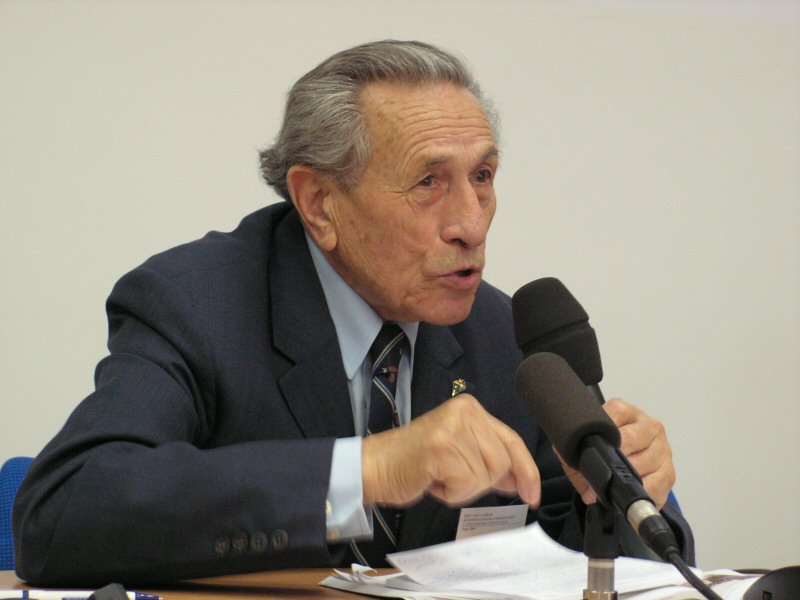
Adolf Burger, who wrote a memoir of his time as a former concentration camp prisoner involved in Operation Bernhard

Lake Toplitz has been the site of several large-scale searches. In 1958 an expedition located several cases of the counterfeit money from Operation Bernhard and a book that detailed the Bank of England's numbering system. Following the death of a diver in the lake in 1963—his two companions on the lake included "a former Nazi secret agent and ... a German business man mentioned in connection with counterfeit gold coins"—the Austrian government undertook a month-long search of the lake, during which they recovered more boxes of notes. The zoologist Hans Fricke from the Max Planck Institute searched the lake bottom for several years for rare aquatic life; in 1989 he took Krüger in a mini-submarine on one of his exploratory trips. In 2000 the submersible that was used to search the wreck of RMS Titanic was used to survey the lake floor, and several boxes of notes were recovered, witnessed by Adolf Burger, a former prisoner involved in the counterfeiting operation.

On seeing the quality of the notes, one bank official described them as "the most dangerous ever seen"; the watermark was the most reliable source for detecting the forgeries. Counterfeit notes worth £15–20 million were in general circulation at the end of the war. With such a volume in general circulation, in April 1943 the Bank of England stopped releasing all notes of £10 and above. In February 1957 a new £5 banknote was issued; the blue note was printed on both sides and "relied on subtle colour changes and detailed machine engraving" for security. Other denominations were also reintroduced: the £10 in February 1964, the £20 in July 1970 and the £50 note in March 1981.

The Tilhas Tizig Gesheften, a small group formed from the British Army's Jewish Brigade, obtained a supply of counterfeit pounds from Jaacov Levy, one of Schwend's money-laundering agents. The forged notes were used to buy equipment and to bring displaced persons to Mandatory Palestine, in defiance of the British blockade of the territory.

Several memoirs have been published by former prisoners, which include the 1949 Norwegian account Falskmynter i blokk 19 by Moritz Nachtstern, and Des Teufels Werkstatt, the 1983 German-language account by Adolf Burger. Both works have been translated into English; several histories about the operation have also been published.

In 1981 Private Schulz, a fictional version of Operation Bernhard, was broadcast on the BBC as a comedy-drama. The television serial starred Michael Elphick and Ian Richardson. In 2007 Burger's memoirs were used as the basis for a film adaption, The Counterfeiters (Die Fälscher), which tells the story of Salomon Sorowitsch, a character loosely based on the lives of Smolianoff and Burger. The film won the Academy Award for Best Foreign Language Film at the 80th Academy Awards. A fictionalised version of events was depicted in the 2026 film Peaky Blinders: The Immortal Man.

It is the policy of the Bank of England to redeem all withdrawn notes for current currency at the face value shown on the note, except for counterfeit currency. (Note: The Bank will retain any counterfeit notes presented to them, and will not pay any money to the bearer.) Examples of counterfeits from Operation Bernhard have appeared at auction and been sold through dealers for a higher face value than the original £5. There are also examples of the notes in the museum of the National Bank of Belgium and the Bank of England Museum. The International Spy Museum holds an example of an Operation Bernhard printing plate.

== See also ==
- Superdollars – high-quality counterfeit dollars suspected to come from a foreign power
- Number Nine Research Laboratory, also called the "Noborito Laboratory", where the Imperial Japanese Army counterfeited Chinese yuan
- Opération Persil, French currency manipulation with counterfeits in Guinea

== Sources ==
=== Books ===
- Bower, Peter (2001). "Operation Bernhard: The German Forgery of British Paper Currency in World War II". In Bower, Peter (ed.). The Exeter Papers. London: The British Association of Paper Historians. pp. 43–65. ISBN 978-0-9525757-2-6.
- Burger, Adolf (2009) [First published in 1983 as The Commando of Counterfeiters]. The Devil's Workshop: A Memoir of the Nazi Counterfeiting Operation. London: Frontline Books. ISBN 978-1-84832-523-4.
- Kahn, David (1978). Hitler's Spies. Boston, MA: Da Capo Press. ISBN 978-0-3068-0949-1.
- Littlejohn, Davis; Dodkins, C. M. (1968). Orders, Decorations, Medals and Badges of the Third Reich. James Bender. ISBN 978-0-9121-3801-5.
- Malkin, Lawrence (2008). Krueger's Men: The Secret Nazi Counterfeit Plot and the Prisoners of Block 19. New York: Little, Brown. ISBN 978-0-316-06750-8.
- Nachtstern, Moritz; Arntzen, Ragnar (2008) [First published in 1949 as Falskmynter i blokk 19 (in Norwegian)]. Counterfeiter: How a Norwegian Jew Survived the Holocaust. Translated by Nachtstern, Sidsel. Oxford: Osprey Publishing. ISBN 978-1-84603-289-9.
- Pirie, Anthony (1961). Operation Bernhard. London: Cassell & Co. OCLC 603725.
- Schwan, C. Frederick; Boling, Joseph E. (1995). World War II Remembered: History in Your Hands, a Numismatic Study. Port Clinton, OH: BNR Press. ISBN 978-0-9319-6040-6.

=== Internet and television media ===
- Boeykens, Coralie (2007). "A Nazi Counterfeit in the National Bank". Museum of the National Bank of Belgium. Archived from the original on 22 January 2020.
- Davids, Brian (23 March 2026). "'Peaky Blinders: The Immortal Man' Writer Steven Knight Reveals a Tom Hardy-Related Twist He Scrapped". Archived from the original on 23 March 2026.
- "Exchanging Notes Issued by the Bank of England" (PDF). Bank of England. Archived from the original (PDF) on 2017-03-21.
- The Great Nazi Cash Swindle (Television production). Channel 4. 14 August 2004.
- Hitler's Lake (Television production). CBS. 21 November 2000.
- "Operation Bernhard Printing Plate". International Spy Museum.
- "Security by Design" (PDF). Bank of England. 2007. Archived from the original (PDF) on 2016-10-05.
- "Withdrawn Banknotes Reference Guide" (PDF). Bank of England. Archived from the original (PDF) on 29 March 2017.

=== Newspapers, journals and magazines ===
- Bassett, Richard (17 November 1984). "Nazi Missile Launch Pad Found in Austrian Lake". The Times. p. 6.
- Connolly, Kate (25 January 2000). "Titanic Mission Submarine Called In to Dredge Lake for Nazi Gold". The Guardian. p. 15.
- Feller, Steven A.; Hamilton, Charles E. (September 1985). "Operation Bernhard: The Ultimate Counterfeiting Scheme". The Numismatist: 1766–1772.
- Howell, Peter (29 February 2008). "On the Money". Toronto Star. p. E02.
- "Hunt Begins for Nazi Treasure". The Guardian. 28 October 1963. p. 1.
- "Nazi "Fivers" on Lake Bottom: War Forgeries Found". The Manchester Guardian. 23 July 1959. p. 7.
- Ruffner, Kevin C. (2002). "On the Trail of Nazi Counterfeiters" (PDF). Studies in Intelligence. 46 (2): 41–53. Archived from the original (PDF) on January 23, 2017.
- "Search for Nazi Treasure in Lake Toplitz Ends". The Guardian. 3 December 1963. p. 9.
- Selway, Jennifer (3 May 1981). "The Week in View". The Observer. p. 48.
- "SS Secrets in Files Raised from Lake". The Times. 12 August 1959. p. 6.
- Tiley, Marc (August 2007). "The Third Reich's Bank of England". History Today. 57 (8): 50–55.
