= Bernhard Kruger (disambiguation) =

Bernhard Kruger may refer to:

- Bernhard Krüger (1904–1989), a German Schutzstaffel Sturmbannführer (Major) during World War II
- Bernhard Krueger (Moravian) (1908–?), German Moravian Church historian and superintendent in South Africa
- Caspar Bernhard Kruger (18th century), German salesman in Belgern and author of Richtig berechnete Tabellen ueber stehendes Holz nach dem Kubikfuss (Torgau, 1790)
- Bernhard Kruger (Catholic) (16th century), German clergyman in Kemnitz-Pritzwalk (1539)
