= Lake Grundlsee =

Largest lake in Styria, Austria

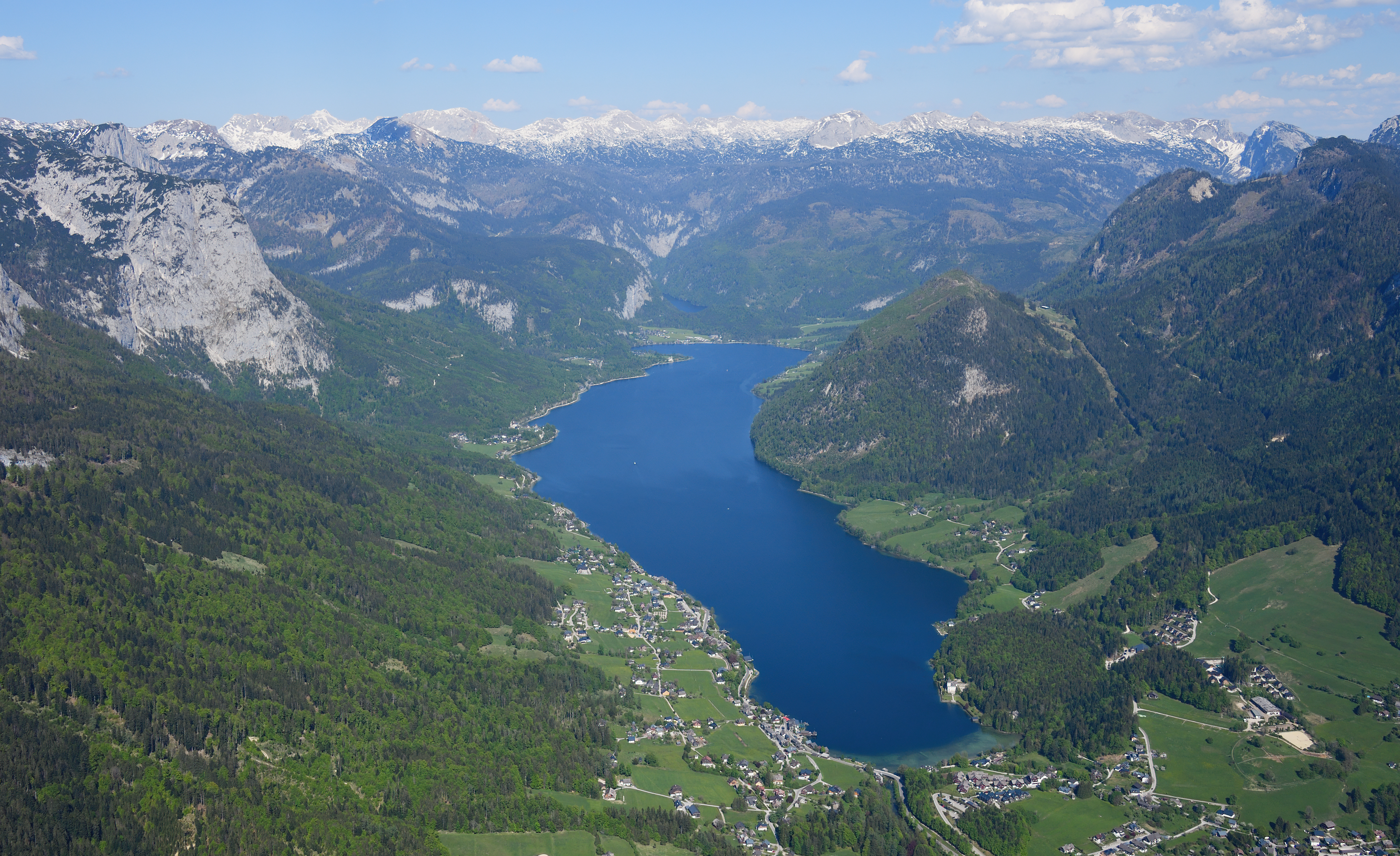
- Grundlsee, view to the east (into the valley)
- Interactive map of Lake Grundlsee
- Location: Salzkammergut, Austria
- Coordinates: 47°38′2″N 13°51′53″E
- Primary inflows: Toplitzbach, Stimitzbach, Zimitzbach
- Max. length: 5,821 kilometres (3,617 mi)
- Max. width: 917 metres (3,009 ft)
- Surface area: 41,395 km^{2} (15,983 sq mi)
- Average depth: 351 metres (1,152 ft)
- Max. depth: 62 metres (203 ft)
- Surface elevation: 708 metres (2,323 ft)
- References: Measurement 2011

Lake Grundlsee is situated at the southern foot of the Totes Gebirge in Austria, in the Styrian part of the Salzkammergut. It lies at an altitude of 708 m above sea level. The municipal seat of Grundlsee is located on the northwest shore. The outflow of the Grundlsee is the Grundlsee Traun, which drains into the Danube via the Traun. With an area of 4.22 km^{2}, Grundlsee is the largest lake in Styria. Its location, situated in a beautiful setting, has made it an important tourist destination and a popular bathing lake, as well as a diving and sailing area, used for other various water activities throughout the year. The Daffodil Festival, Austria's largest flower festival, occurs every third year at Grundlsee. A professional fisherman manages the lake. The most prevalent fish species is the lake char (Salvelinus umbla), which is marketed as the Lake Aussee lake char.

== Geography ==
Lake Grundlsee is situated entirely within the municipality of Grundlsee. The settlement center of Grundlsee is located on the northwestern shore. The lake is encircled in a horseshoe shape by the mountains of the Totes Gebirge. A karst plateau begins in the north-west with the Trisselwand (1754 m above sea level), which extends over the rugged Backenstein (1722 m above sea level) to the Reichenstein (1913 m above sea level) and the Siniweler (1907 m above sea level) in the north-east. On the eastern bank is the district of Gößl with the Gößler Wand. To the south, the Ressen (1303 m above sea level) rises. The hilly landscape of the Aussee basin begins in the west.

The lake, which extends from west-southwest to east-northeast, has a length of 5.8 km and a maximum width of 917 meters. Its surface area is approximately 4.14 km^{2}, with an average depth of 35 meters. The lake basin exhibits steep slopes, particularly on the northern and southern shores. On the eastern and western shores, shallower areas with gradually increasing depths are observed. The deepest point of the lake is situated approximately in the middle of the lake, with a depth of approximately 62 meters. The total volume of water in the lake is estimated to be 145 million cubic meters.

The lake can be reached via Grundlseer Straße L703, which runs along the northern shore to the village of Gößl in the east.

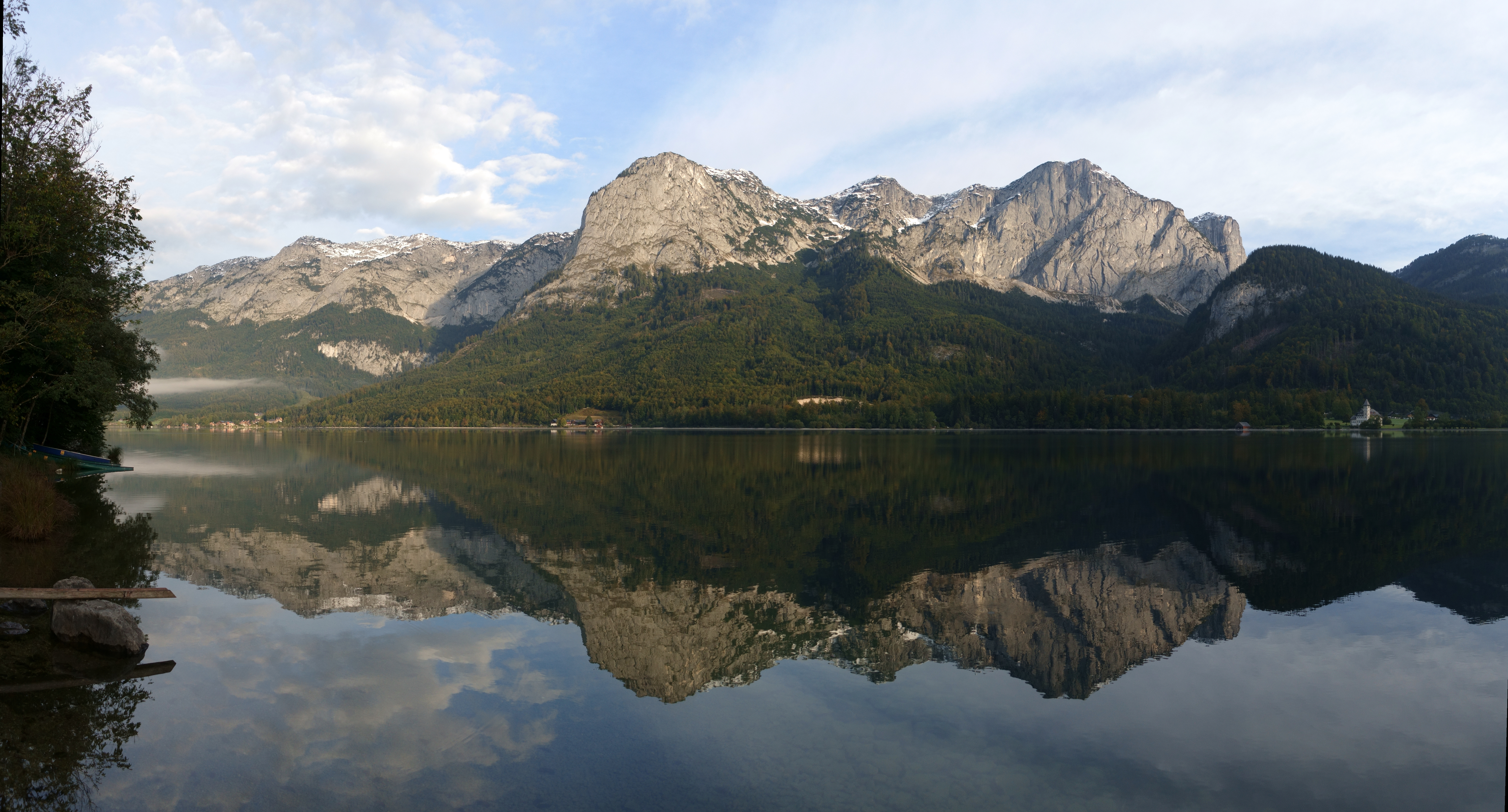
View from Wienern on the southern shore across the Grundlsee to the north to the Backenstein (center) and Reichenstein (right)

== Hydrology ==
The hydrological catchment area of Lake Grundlsee has a total area of 125 km^{2} and lies entirely within the Totes Gebirge. The lake is primarily fed by the Toplitzbach, which drains the Toplitzsee, and the Stimitzbach. Toplitzbach and Stimitzbach flow into the eastern part of Grundlsee near each other. The village of Gößl is situated on the alluvial cone of the Toplitzbach. The district of Gaiswinkel was constructed on alluvial deposits of the Mühlbach. Like the Zimitzbach stream, the latter created a small, now populated delta into the lake in the vicinity of the district of Schachen. The Grundlsee Traun leaves the lake in the west at the lake lodge, where a bridge crosses the outflow. The discharge is 5.94 m^{3}/s. The theoretical lake retention time is 0.9 years.

== Geology ==
=== Tectonics ===
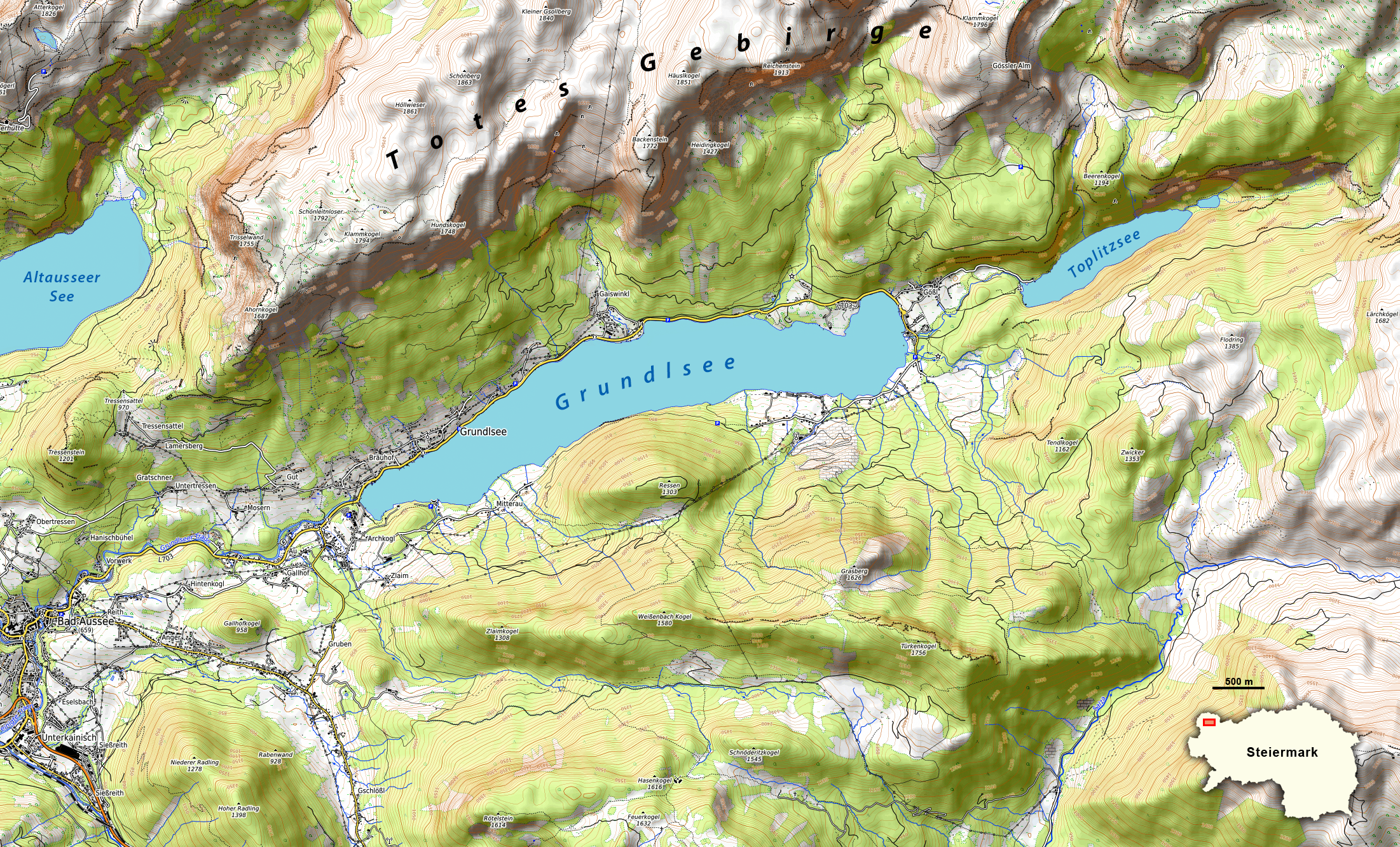
Topographical map of Grundlsee lake. The Grundlsee local glacier carved out the lake basin from east to west.

The Grundlsee is located on the southwestern edge of the Toten Gebirge formation, which is part of the Northern Limestone Alps. This overlying unit consists mainly of Mesozoic limestones and dolomites of the Triassic and Jurassic periods. The basin of Grundlsee lies along a geological disturbance running from west-southwest to east-northeast. This line, known as the Toplitzsee Fault, extends through the Toplitzsee and Kammersee lakes into the Tote Gebirge mountain range. There are remnants of terminal and lateral moraines around the lake. Tressenstein and Plassen limestones dominate the north of the lake, while Hallstätter limestone dominates the south. The eastern part, and thus the main catchment area, is formed by Dachstein Formation. The Haselgebirge mountains also occur on the southern shore near Vienna, where Saint-Gobain Rigips Austria mines the largest gypsum deposit in the Eastern Alps.

=== Former glaciation and formation ===
The ice-age Grundlsee local glacier, which originated from the high plateau of the Totes Gebirge and flowed into the Aussee basin, also followed the fault-induced zone of weakness. This widened the valley and excavated the tongue basin of Lake Grundlsee. At its western end, the glacier left behind a terminal moraine wall, which is several tens of meters high. This dammed off the lake. The first lake was formed at the edge of the ice body at the same time as the over-deepened basin became ice-free. The high edge of the debris formation around the basin of the Grundlsee indicates this phase with the ice body in the lake basin. The lake area was originally larger and extended from the Toplitz to the Kammersee during the late Würm glacial period. After the final disappearance of the ice, the alluvial cone adjusted to today's lake level. In the post-glacial period, the lake basin underwent constant change due to sedimentation, and it will likely have disappeared again in a few tens of thousands of years.

== Climate ==
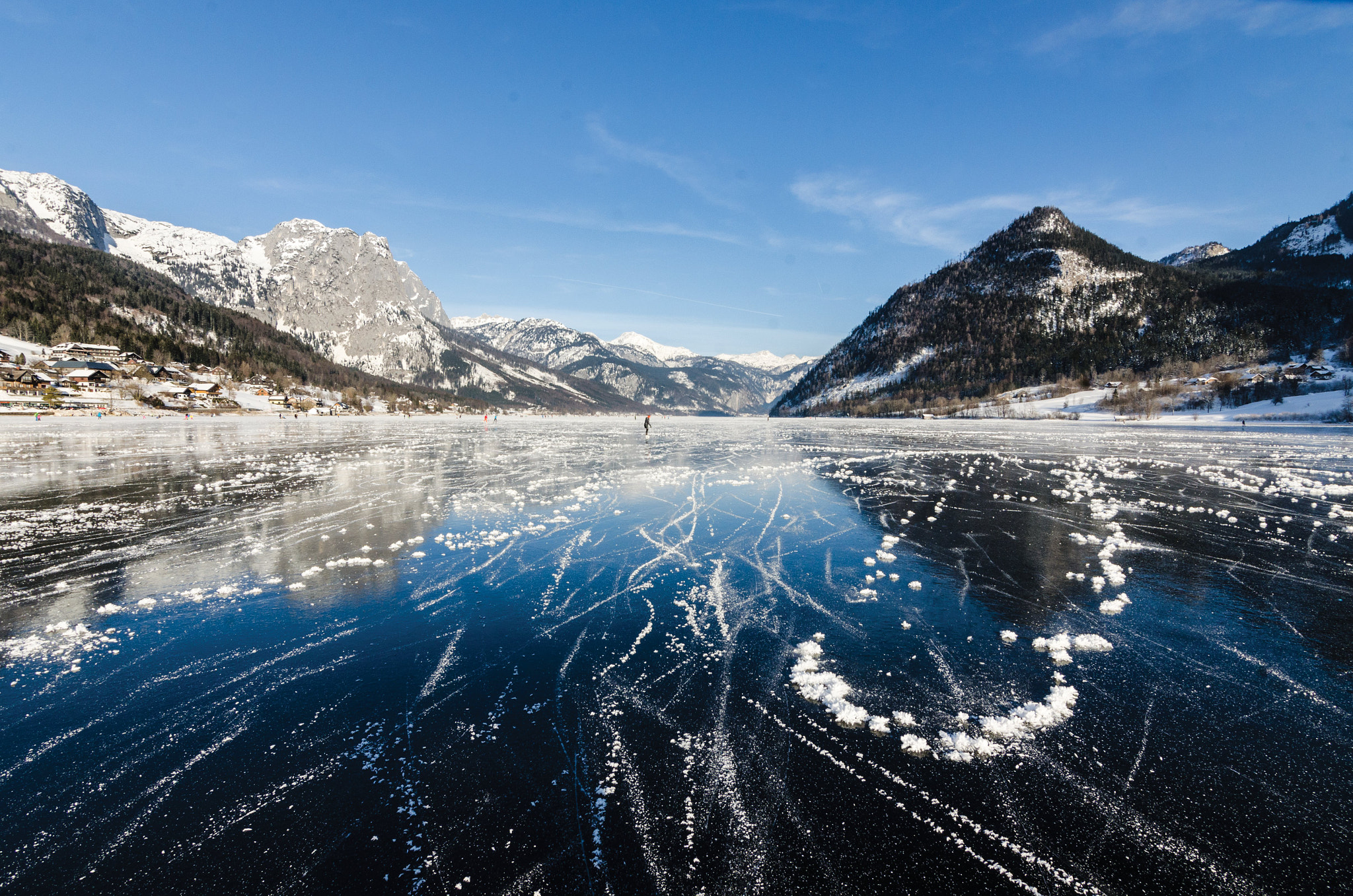
The lake often freezes over completely in winter, as here in March 2017

The Central Institution for Meteorology and Geodynamics in Bad Aussee, situated 3 km away, provides precise data for Lake Grundlsee. The climate data indicates a temperature and precipitation distribution typical of the northern Limestone Alps, characterized by cool summers with high precipitation, with a maximum of 15.6 °C and 208 mm in July, and winters with low precipitation, with a minimum temperature of -2.7 °C in January. Precipitation exhibits a secondary maximum from December to January. The annual precipitation amount was 1566 mm, with an average annual temperature of 7.7 °C. Due to the frequent accumulation of clouds on the edge of the Totes Gebirge, above-average precipitation falls in the area of Lake Grundlsee. A comparison of the annual precipitation in Bad Mitterndorf (803 m above sea level) on the south side of the Totes Gebirge, with a value of 1222 mm, demonstrates the barrier effect of the Totes Gebirge at a similar altitude and a distance of only 10 km. The duration of winter snow cover is approximately 126 days.

== Limnology ==
=== Circulation ===
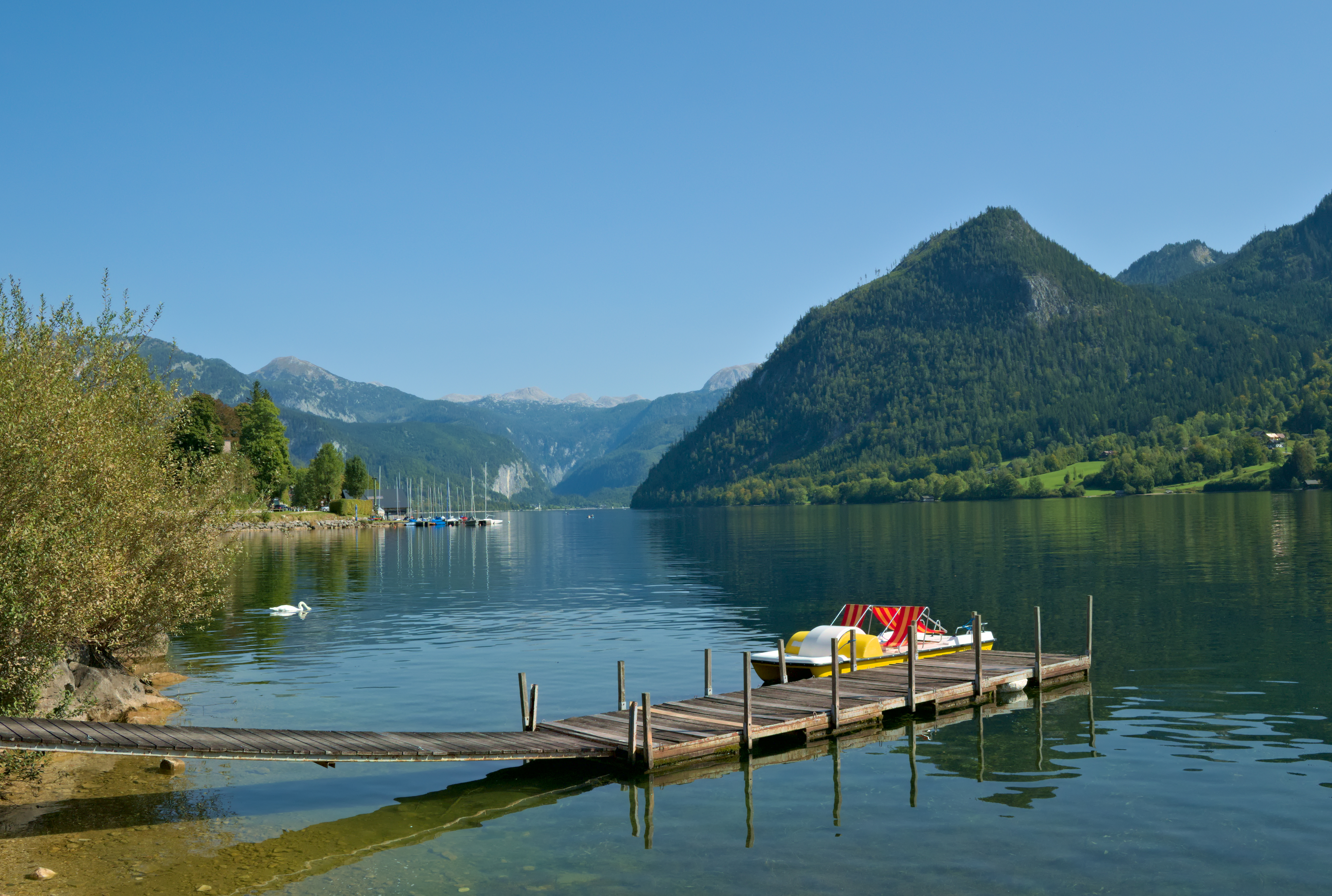
The lake is particularly popular for swimming in summer due to the mild water temperatures

Lake Grundlsee is a dimictic lake. Following the melting of the ice in spring, the water body undergoes mixing, resulting in the influx of oxygen-rich water into the depths. During the summer months, a thermocline forms, with only the surface layer warming up. This is followed by renewed mixing in the fall, leading to the formation of ice. There are pronounced stratification conditions in Lake Grundlsee. The epilimnion is only approximately five meters thick. The uniformly tempered hypolimnion begins at a depth of 30 meters. Following the spring circulation, the water temperatures at the surface begin to rise, reaching a surface average of 17.5 °C during measurements in August between the years 2000 and 2006. The highest recorded water temperature of 22 °C was observed during the summer of 2003. Below a depth of 30 meters, temperatures average 4.2 °C. Before the onset of the summer stagnation phase, the hypolimnion warms by an average of only 0.1 °C. The lake is covered by a layer of ice on an average of 64 days per year.

=== Trophic ===
The lake has a low concentration of nutrients, which results in an oligotrophic state. Measurements conducted between the years 2000 and 2006 revealed an average phosphorus content of 5.7 μg/L for Lake Grundlsee. Due to the discharge of untreated wastewater, a trend towards eutrophication was observed in the 1960s, with the oxygen saturation above ground already showing signs of decline. Consequently, remediation measures were implemented, which were concluded in 1980 with the construction of a regional wastewater treatment plant with a third treatment stage in the Bad Aussee municipal area. The oxygen situation improved rapidly, and the oligotrophic state of the lake could be maintained in the long term. Due to the low phytoplankton concentration and low algae growth, the average summer visibility depth is 8.5 meters.

=== Plankton ===
According to studies of chlorophyll, the growth of algae in Lake Grundlsee is minimal. The phytoplankton is primarily composed of cryptophyceae and diatoms, with species of the genus Cyclotella being particularly prevalent. Notably, Cyclotella styriaca is a distinctive feature, as this species has thus far been observed exclusively in Lake Altaussee and Lake Grundlsee. In contrast, the zooplankton exhibits significantly greater biomass. Of the rotifers, Kellicottia longispina, Keratella cochlearis, and Keratella hiemalis were frequently observed. The crustacean plankton of Lake Grundlsee is largely composed of the species Eudiaptomus gracilis, Cyclops abyssorum, Daphnia hyalina, and Eubosmina longispina.

== Flora and vegetation ==
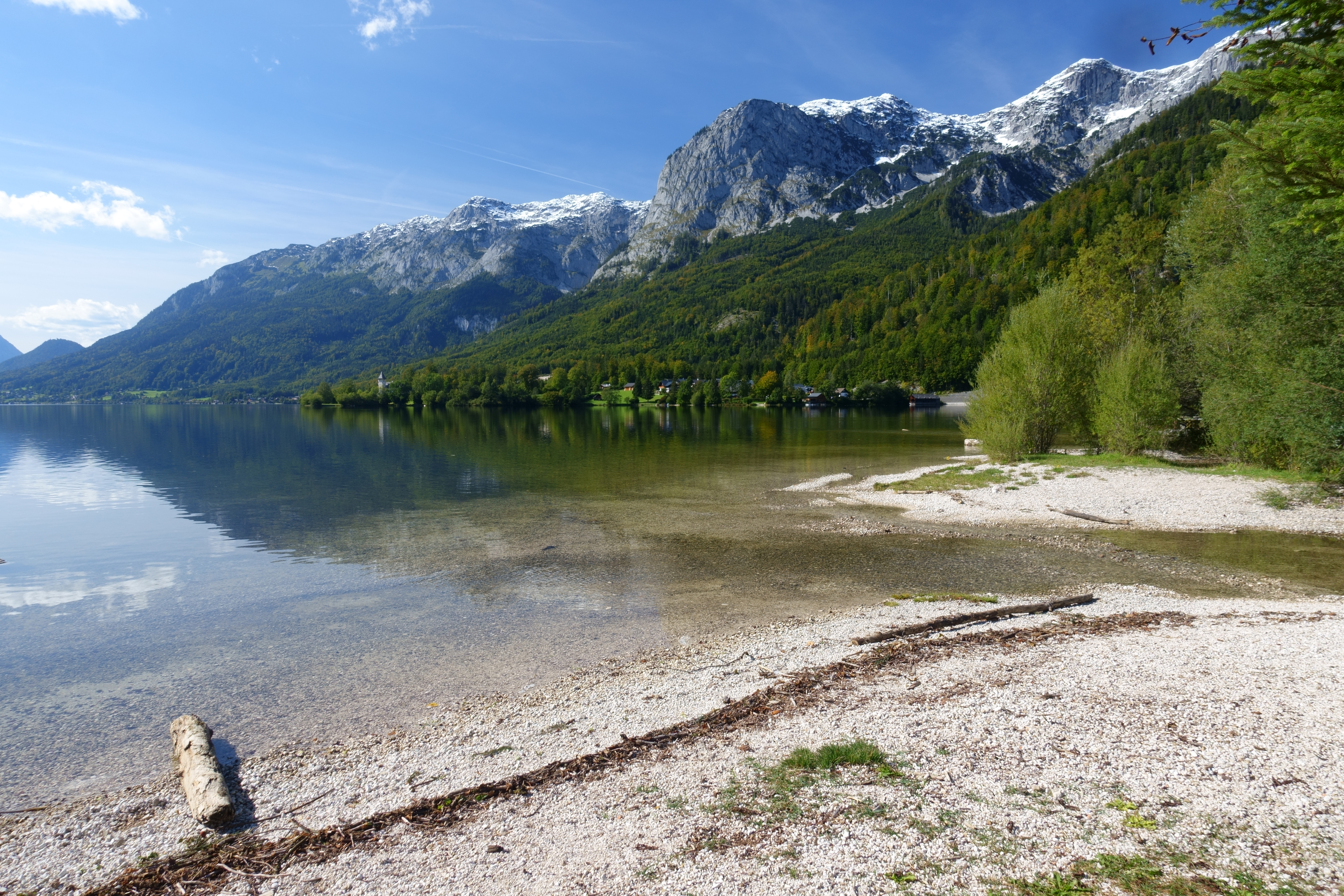
Natural bank at the mouth of the Toplitzbach stream

The aquatic flora of the lake is particularly diverse due to the alternation of stony and sandy-muddy, richly structured shore areas. At the Gößl dam, for example, there are dense stands of graminaceous pondweed (Potamogeton gramineus) and shimmering pondweed (Potamogeton × nitens). Other vascular plants include Canadian waterweed (Elodea canadensis), spiked milfoil (Myriophyllum spicatum), Berchtold's dwarf pondweed (Potamogeton berchtoldii), and curly pondweed (Potamogeton crispus), reflecting pondweed (Potamogeton lucens), floating pondweed (Potamogeton natans), and crested pondweed (Potamogeton pectinatus), perfoliate pondweed (Potamogeton perfoliatus), and hairy water crowfoot (Ranunculus trichophyllus). Brackish algae include the following species: Chara contraria, Chara globularis, Chara strigosa, and Chara virgata.

== Fauna ==
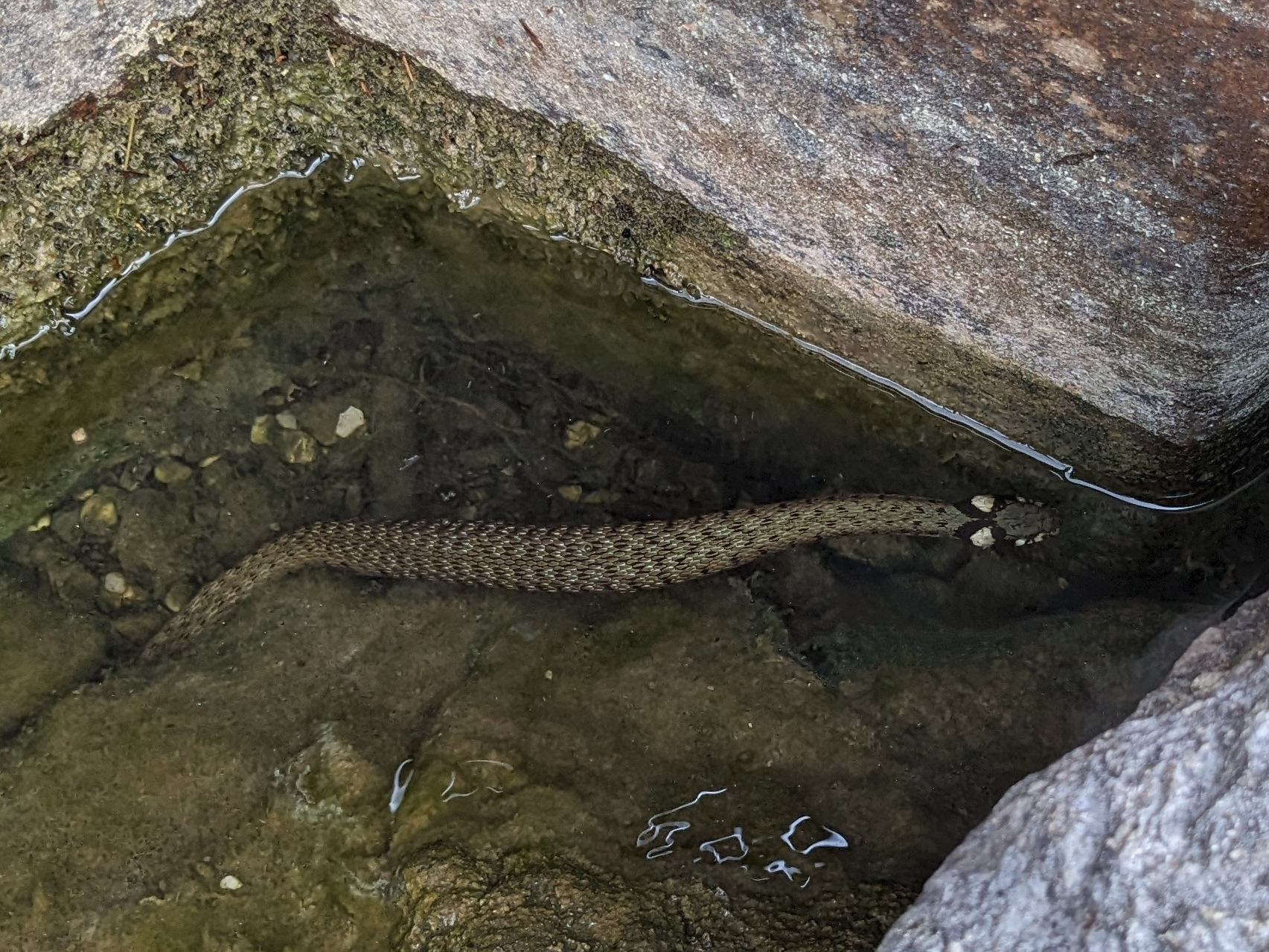
Grass snake (Natrix natrix) on the eastern shore

Originally, only the following eight fish species were native to Lake Grundlsee: burbot (Lota lota), chub (Squalius cephalus), minnow (Phoxinus phoxinus), stone loach (Barbatula barbatula), lake trout (Salmo trutta), Danube bleak (Alburnus chalcoides), and lake char (Salvelinus alpinus). The following fish species also occur as a result of artificial stocking or introduction Eel (Anguilla anguilla), Perch (Perca fluviatilis), Pike (Esox lucius), Bullhead (Cottus gobio) and Coregonus (Coregonus sp.).

The most conspicuous bird species at Lake Grundlsee and the other Salzkammergut lakes is the Mute Swan (Cygnus olor), which was first recorded at Lake Traunsee in 1875. It has been recorded at Grundlsee since the 1950s. Other common annual birds are the Mallard (Anas platyrhynchos) and the Coot (Fulica atra). Tufted Duck (Aythya fuligula), Pochard (Aythya ferina) and Great Crested Grebe (Podiceps cristatus) are less common. The cormorant (Phalacrocorax carbo) is native to Lake Grundlsee and feeds on the fish in the lake as well as the fish from the surrounding breeding grounds, which is why it is also hunted there.

== Economy ==
=== Shipping ===
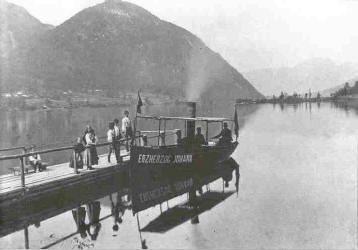
The steamboat "Archduke Johann" 1879

In 1879, Albin Schraml founded a steamboat company and opened the small wooden steamboat Archduke Johann on June 14, 1879. The Grundlsee shipping company changed hands several times. In 2015, Tauroa GmbH took over the company from Dietrich Mateschitz. From the end of April to the end of October, scheduled and excursion boats operate on the lake with three motorboats (Rudolf, Traun and Gössl) as well as flatboats. The scheduled boats ply a north–south course between the western and southern shores. There are also several rental stations for electric boats. On Grundlsee, as on all lakes in the Inner Salzkammergut, internal combustion engines are prohibited. Exceptions are made for commercial fishing, regular shipping, and rescue and firefighting vehicles.

=== Fishing ===
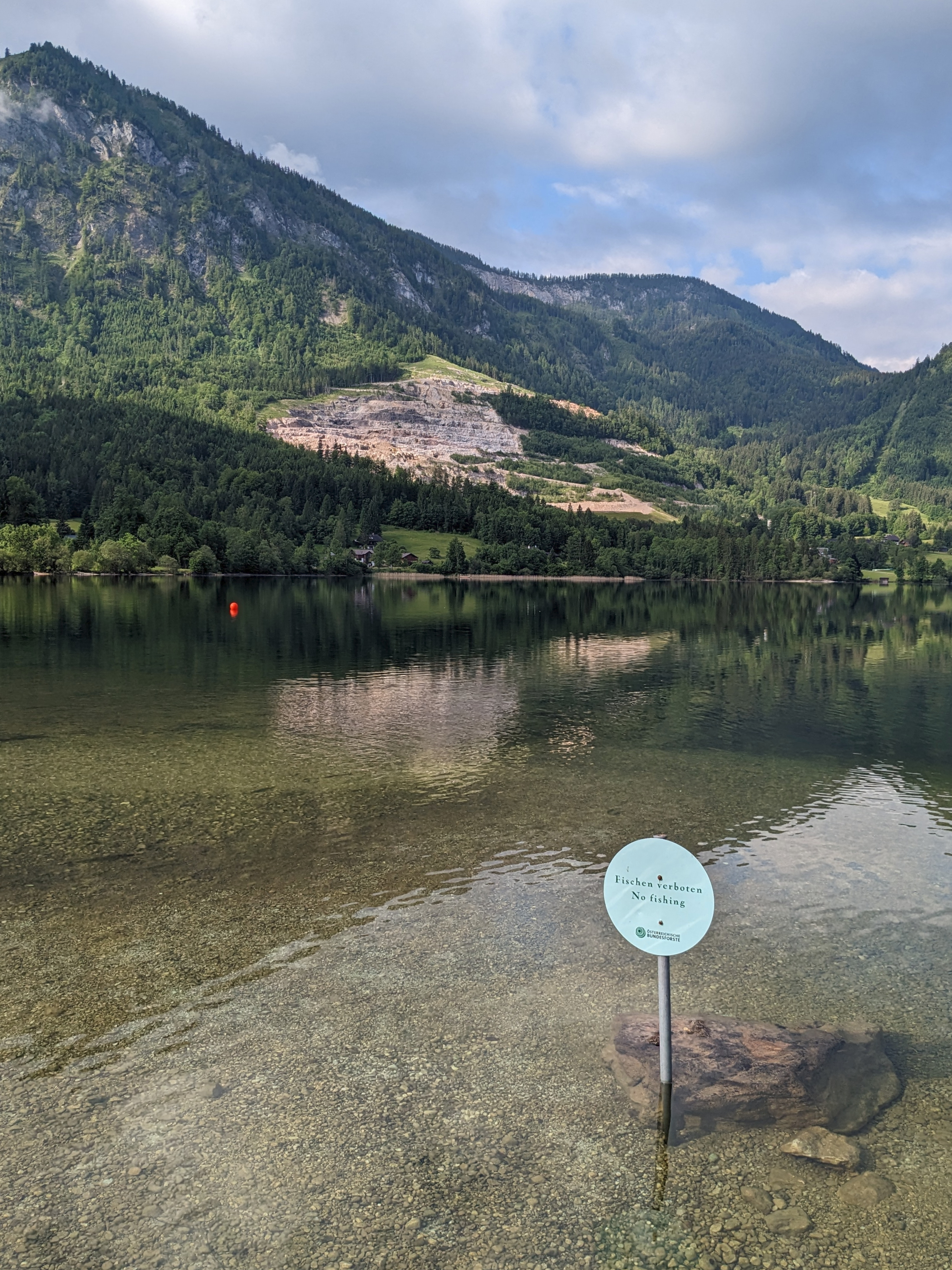
The eastern side is designated as a protected area (spawning sanctuary). View of the Vienna gypsum and anhydrite opencast mine

The Grundlsee lake has been used for fishing since the 13th century. Fishing is mentioned in the general urbarium of Duke Albrecht from 1280 to 1295. In 1425, a document issued by Frederick III listed the names of those who had the right to fish in the lake. Professional fishing flourished in the Middle Ages and net fishing was already highly developed. In the Middle Ages, live fish were still transported to the court in Graz in wooden barrels. In the 16th century, arctic char was delivered to the court in Vienna. Due to the long distances involved, they were often transported fried, salted, or pickled.

Today the fishery is professionally managed by a professional fisherman from the Austrian Federal Forests. The main fish species is the lake char (Salvelinus umbla). The annual catch is about 3000 kg of fish. Similar to the nearby Hallstätter See, the catch should correspond to the annual natural growth in the water. The perch (Perca fluviatilis) was not originally native to the lake but was introduced at the end of the 1980s for unknown reasons. As an alien species, it changed the aquatic ecosystem and damaged the population of minnows and arctic char, on whose spawn it feeds. To restore the balance, attempts are being made to reduce the perch population. One way to do this is to sink spruce branches on which the perch spawn. The branches are retrieved and the fish eggs are destroyed. Since then, the main task of the Grundlsee fishery has been to rebuild the typical fish fauna of the area, especially the native Grundlsee char and the lake trout. The latter fish species reaches large proportions in the Grundlsee. The largest lake trout ever caught weighed 27 kg and is on display in the Grundlsee town hall.

In 2005, a mass infection of lake char with the tapeworm Triaenophorus crassus was detected for the first time. The tapeworm causes cysts in the flesh of the fish, making them unfit for human consumption. Whitefish are usually the intermediate host and pike the final host. In order to protect the char population, efforts have been made to remove pike from the lake. This is done through targeted fishing and catch bonuses. In order to rebuild a good population of lake char and brown trout in Lake Grundlsee, three year-round protected areas have been established where fishing is prohibited.

=== Tourism ===
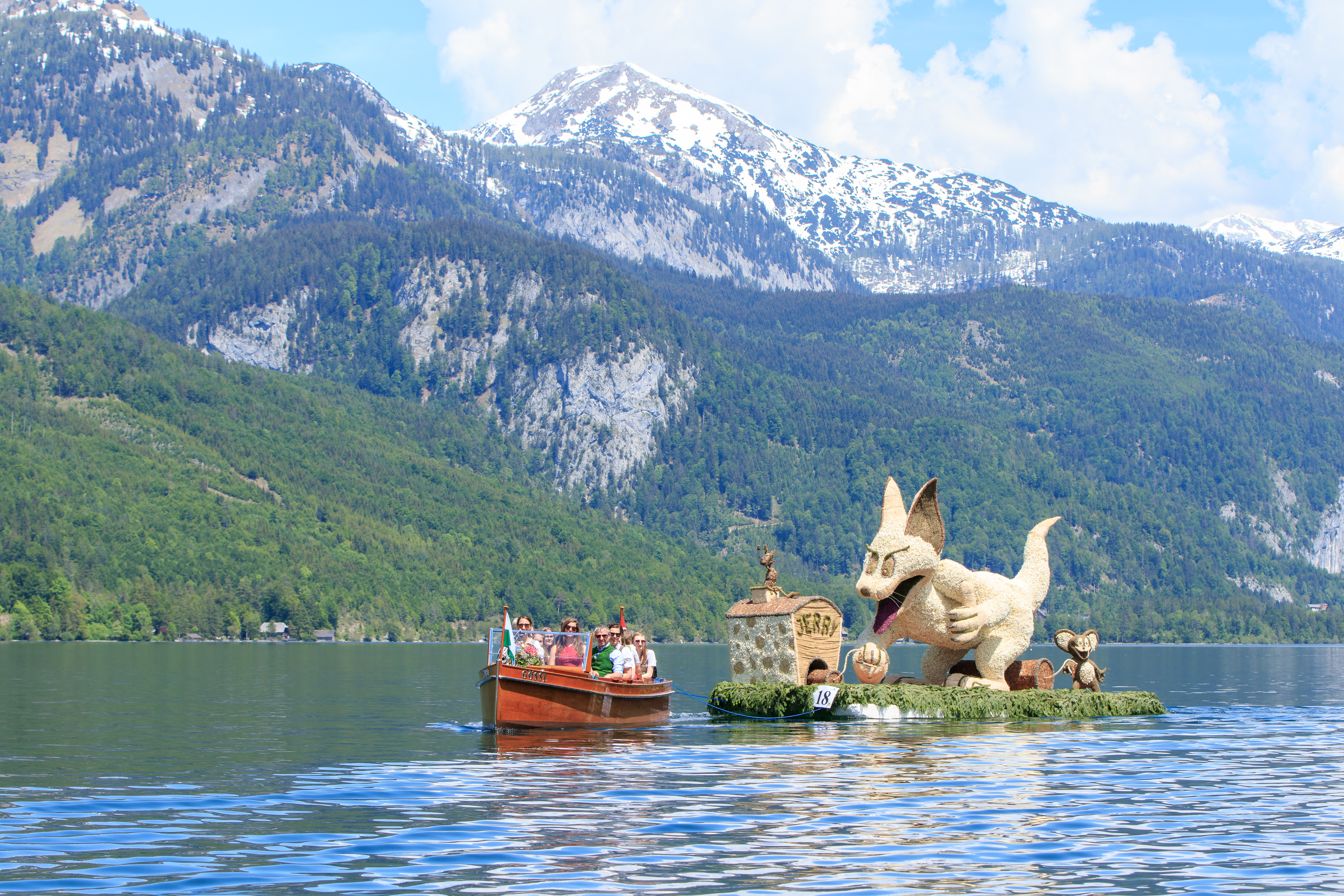
Daffodils festival 2019

Lake Grundlsee is a popular destination due to its beautiful location. The surrounding villages have a well-developed tourist infrastructure with accommodation and catering facilities. There is a campground on the eastern shore. Most of the shore is freely accessible. There are several public natural bathing areas and bathing jetties around the lake. There is an outdoor swimming pool in the village of Archkogl. The Grundlsee is also suitable for ice skating and ice stock sport, as it often freezes over in winter. During the Daffodils Festival, which lasts several days at the end of May/beginning of June, there is a boat parade on the lake every third year. Sculptures decorated with star daffodils are displayed.

== Sport ==
Due to the good wind conditions, the Grundlsee is a popular sailing and surfing area. The Styrian Yacht Club Grundlsee, located in the Bräuhof district, was founded in 1954. Grundlsee is often the site of a typical thermal, which can develop due to its topographical location. Under stable, fair weather conditions, the warming of the mountain massif in the northeast creates a vertical current in the early afternoon, which is fed by cool air from the western outflow into the basin in the east. This creates a constant fresh breeze even when the high pressure is stable. Because of the usually excellent visibility, the Grundlsee is a popular diving area. There is a diving school at the bathing area in Gößl.

Grundlsee is the starting point for several hiking trails:

- Path 213: From Schachen via Gößler Alm to Wildgößl
- Trail 214: From Gößl via the Lahngang Lakes to the Pühringer Hut
- Trail 235: From the Grundlsee area via the Almbergweg to the Albert-Appel-Haus
- Trail 272: From Gößl to Schneckenalm

== Naming ==
The Enns Valley was a settlement area of the Alpine Slavs and many place names are of Slavic origin. Grundlsee was first mentioned in 1188 as "Chrungilse" and goes back to the Old Slavic krǫglo jezero (round lake). The name was Germanized early on, as the Old Slavic nasal has been preserved. The hydronym was later adapted to the Middle High German grundel (gudgeon). The name of the stream that flows into it, the Toplitzbach, comes from the Slavic toplica, meaning warm spring water. Since it is the largest lake in Styria, the locals also call it the "Styrian Sea".

== History ==
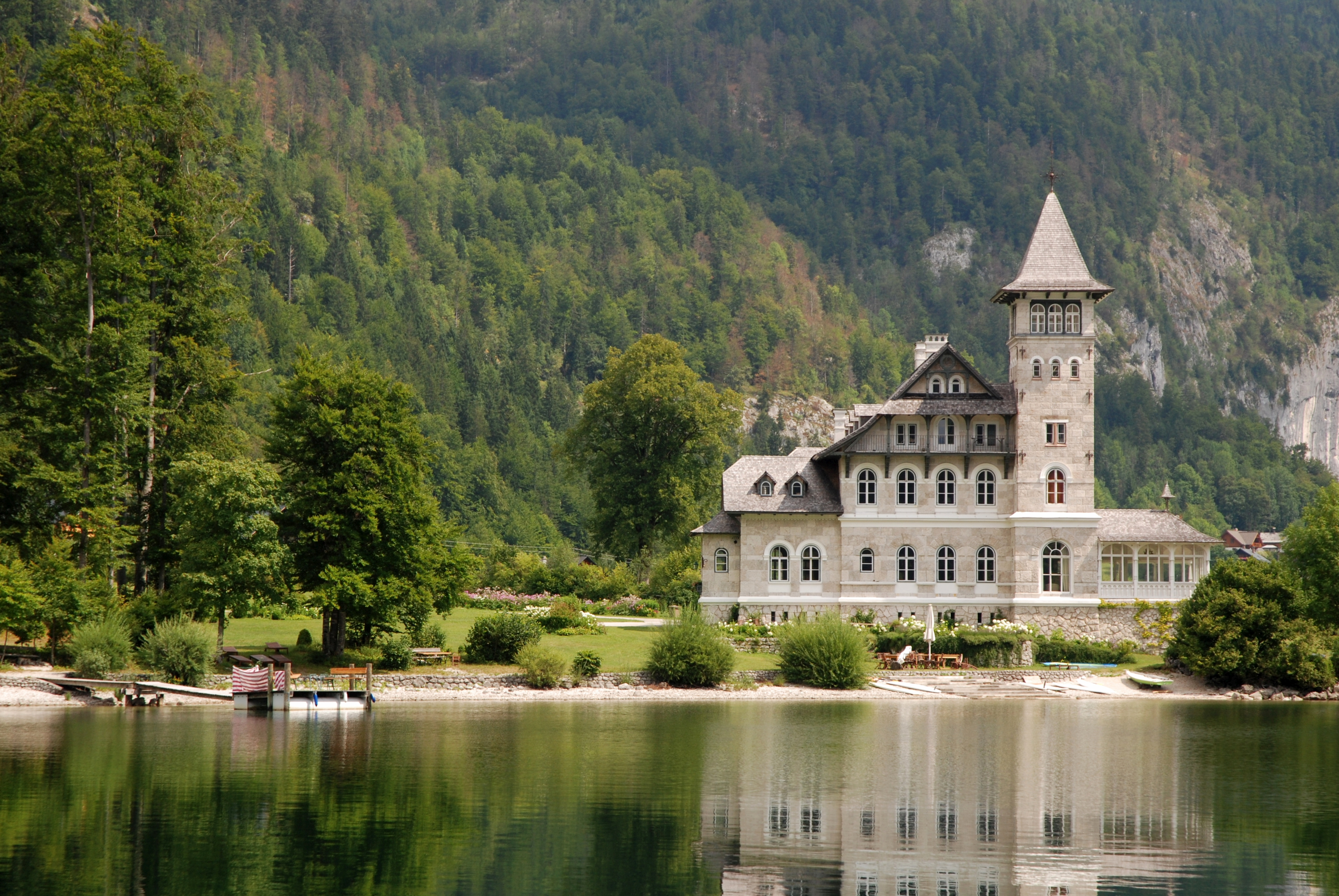
Villa Roth, also known as Grundlsee Castle, is the dominant building on the eastern side of Grundlsee

As with all the lakes in the inner Salzkammergut, there was also a splash dam for timber rafting at the outlet of the Grundlsee, where large quantities of water could be stored with relatively few resources. It was mentioned for the first time in the forest survey of 1561. At that time it was made entirely of wood. The average lifespan of a hermitage was 30 years. To reduce the high consumption of wood due to the frequent construction of new buildings, important hermitages were rebuilt with stone blocks in the middle of the 18th century as part of the reforms of Salzamtmann Freiherr von Sternbach. This was the case with the Grundlsee Lake Lodge in 1754. It was renovated in 1883. There was an outer rake to collect the flooded wood, which was probably built around 1300. An outer rake was probably built in the Grundlseetraun around 1500. After the brewery in Markt Aussee was closed in 1867, the rakes were no longer in use. The hermitage was probably destroyed by a flood in 1899. The last remains of the rakes were removed during the damming up of the river after the catastrophic floods of 1897 and 1899.

The lake lodge is a listed ensemble of buildings dating from the 16th century. It includes a fish cold store. It stands on stilts in the water and keeps fish in underwater cages.

During World War II, Ausseer Land and Grundlsee were part of the Alpine Fortress and a retreat for the National Socialists. Villa Roth, used as a summer residence by Joseph Goebbels and his family, is located on the northeastern shore. From 1943 to 1945, the villa was the official office of the Chemical and Physical Research Institute of the Navy (CPVA), which maintained an experimental station on Lake Toplitz. At the end of the war, the Villa Castiglioni housed parts of the Führer Library, which had been created as part of the Linz Special Mission.

== Lake Grundlsee in art and literature ==
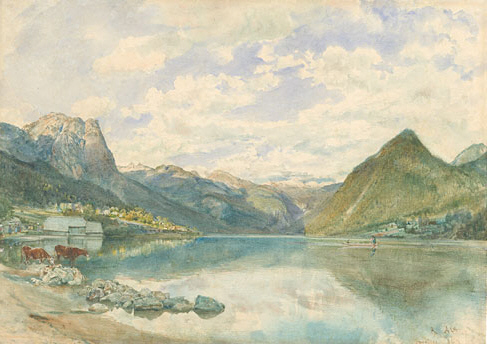
Rudolf von Alt: Mountain landscape with the Grundlsee, 1859

The lake is the subject of the legend of Der Wassermann vom Grundlsee. The legend tells of fishermen who caught a merman. Out of pity, they released him and the water sprite revealed the salt deposits in the Sandling to them. The merman adorns the coat of arms of the municipality of Grundlsee.

You know! My sweet element turns sour and gives acquisition to you all! In your mountains lies the kernel; it runs salty and smokes at the two sea traunas!

— Hans von der Sann, Legends from the Green Mark, Graz 1911, Sagen.at

During the Biedermeier period, landscape painters came to the Salzkammergut and Lake Grundlsee. Rudolf von Alt, Conrad Kreuzer, and Ferdinand Georg Waldmüller created paintings of the lake and its surroundings. Views from the western shore to the Backenstein were particularly popular motifs.

Grundlsee is the title of a novel by the Austrian writer Gustav Ernst.

== Bibliography ==
- Office of the Styrian Provincial Government, Department of Water Supervision (ed.): 1. Steirischer Seenbericht. Graz 2008 (steiermark.at [PDF; retrieved on May 30, 2022]).
- Harald Lobitzer: Geologische Spaziergänge: Ausseerland – Salzkammergut. Ed.: Joint production of the Geological Survey of Vienna and the Chamber Court Museum Bad Aussee. Vienna 2011, ISBN 978-3-85316-063-3
- Gerhard W. Mandl, Dirk van Husen, Harald Lobitzer: Erläuterungen zu Blatt 69 Bad Ischl. Ed.: Federal Geological Survey. Vienna 2012 (geologie.ac.at [PDF; retrieved on May 30, 2022]).
