= Operation Persil =

1959–60 covert French sabotage in Guinea

Opération Persil was a 1960 covert operation by the French government aimed at destabilising the post-independence government of Guinea due to Guinean president Ahmed Sékou Touré's rejection of the French Community and the CFA franc, and his successful campaign for Guinean independence. The operation involved several senior figures within the French government, notably Jacques Foccart, Charles de Gaulle’s chief adviser on African affairs. The plan sought to undermine Touré’s government through economic sabotage and the support of armed opposition groups.

The operation, named after the detergent brand Persil, was modeled after the Nazi Operation Bernhard and involved the French intelligence agency Service de Documentation Extérieure et de Contre-Espionnage (SDECE) producing large quantities of counterfeit Guinean francs to flood Guinea’s economy and trigger hyperinflation. Another phase of the operation aimed to arm and organize exiled Guinean diaspora and dissidents into paramilitary groups to cause internal unrest. However, the plan quickly unraveled after leaks and international scrutiny. On 10 May 1960, Senegalese authorities intercepted a French-organized weapons shipment bound for Guinea, exposing the operation and prompting a diplomatic scandal.

The failure of Opération Persil further deteriorated relations between France and Guinea, reinforcing Touré’s distrust of France and bolstering his campaign to eliminate political dissidents. In the following years, Guinea severed all diplomatic ties with France, and aligned itself with socialist and non-aligned states such as Russia and China.

== French Neo-colonialism and Françafrique ==
While Guinea was the first of France's African colonies to gain independence, the 1950s still saw a rapid decline of the French empire. France developed a set of political, military, and economic practices that scholars and activists have described as neocolonialism. After the loss of Indochina and amid the Algerian War, the return of Charles de Gaulle to power in 1958 marked a reconfiguration of France’s relationship with its African territories. Under the new Fifth Republic, which significantly strengthened presidential authority, de Gaulle and his allies sought to preserve French influence across sub-Saharan Africa even as most colonies achieved formal independence in 1960. French policy favored leaders viewed as politically reliable, such as Léopold Sédar Senghor in Senegal and Félix Houphouët-Boigny in Côte d’Ivoire, while more radical or socialist figures, most notably Guinea’s Ahmed Sékou Touré, were subjected to diplomatic pressure and covert destabilization. During the 1960s, France supported or facilitated several military coups in states such as Gabon, Mali, and the Republic of the Congo, illustrating the continued role of the French military in shaping postcolonial political orders.

Neocolonial influence also operated through economic and institutional mechanisms grouped under the term “cooperation.” Despite independence, key sectors, including schools, infrastructure, and banking systems, continued to serve French strategic and commercial interests. The CFA franc, introduced during the colonial period and maintained after independence, became a central instrument of this system: countries using the currency were required to deposit a substantial portion of their foreign reserves in the French Treasury, effectively granting France considerable oversight of their monetary policy. French multinational corporations consolidated control over extractive industries such as uranium in Niger, oil in Gabon, and agricultural production in several West and Central African states. Critics described this network of political patronage, economic dependence, and military intervention as Françafrique, an arrangement sustained not only by French officials and businesses but also by African elites whose interests aligned with Paris.

== Background ==
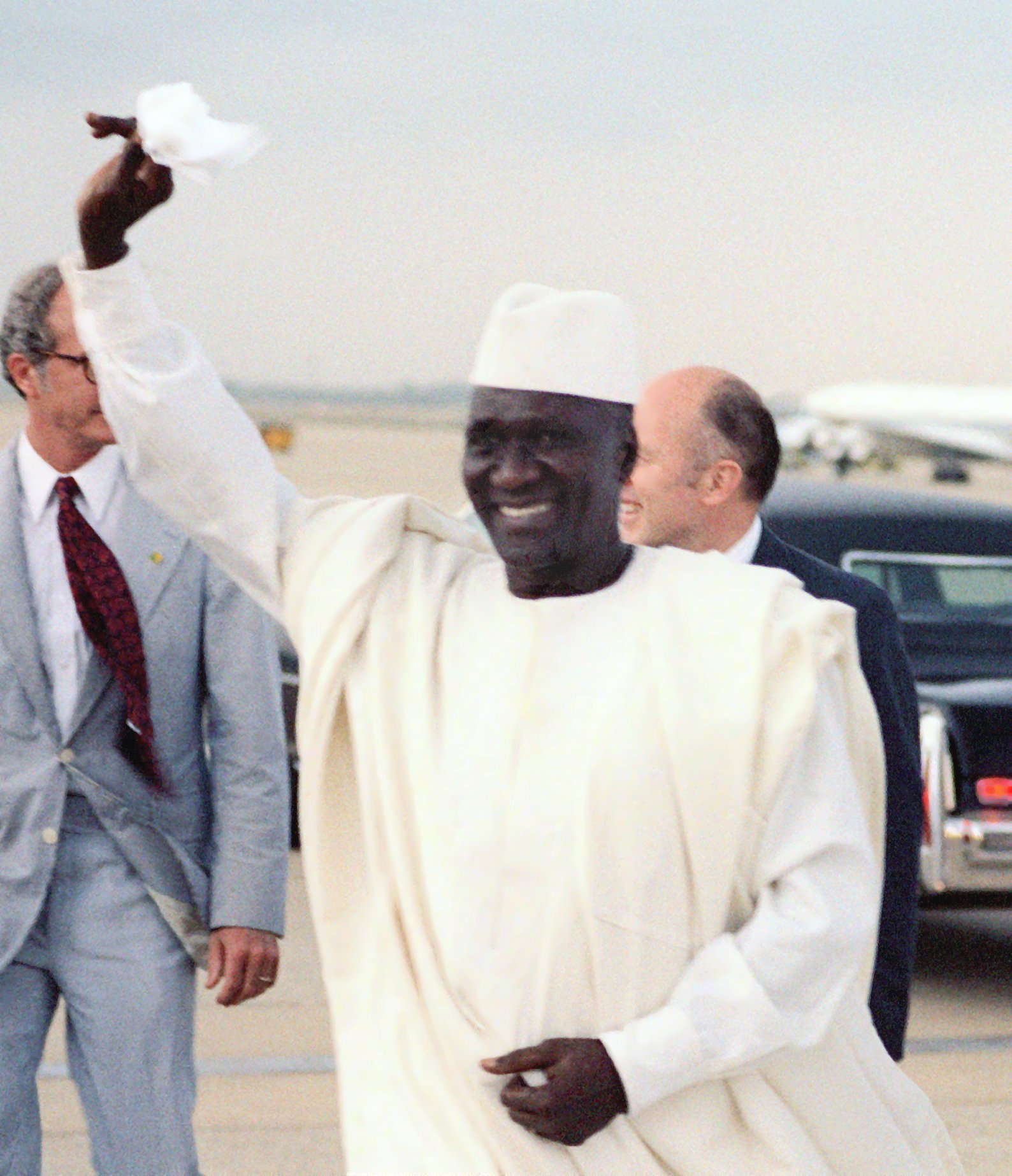
Ahmed Sekou Touré

In September 1958, a constitutional referendum was held in Guinea, then still a French colony, which, if passed, French colonies would become part of the new French Community. If rejected, the territory would be granted independence. During the referendum campaign, French President Charles de Gaulle visited Guinea. De Gaulle warned that states voting "no" would commit "secession", and that France would pull out their financial and material aids. The ruling party, Democratic Party of Guinea, led by Ahmed Sekou Touré, heavily campaigned for a "no" vote. During de Gaulle's visit, Touré made a speech to the crowd to advocate rejecting the French Community, stating "There is no dignity without freedom: we prefer freedom in poverty to riches in slavery." All of France's colonies voted yes but Guinea. On 2 October 1958, Guinea proclaimed its independence, and Sékou Touré became its first ever president.

Although President Ahmed Sékou Touré campaigned for Guinea’s independence from France in the 1958 referendum, he did not seek a complete break in economic relations with France. During the run-up to the vote, Touré attempted to convince French businesses operating in Guinea that the country wanted to remain economically linked to France. He announced that Guinea’s “deepest desire [was] to remain in the franc zone,” with freedom of capital movement between the two countries. At the same time, however, Touré also explained that Guinea could eventually join another currency zone should continued membership in the franc zone prove impossible.

After independence in October 1958, Guinea remained in the franc zone while also exploring establishing a national currency. Negotiations between Guinean and French officials on monetary policy lasted several months. Touré and his government wanted a national currency that was within the bounds of the franc zone yet free from the limitations imposed by Paris, which they described as “humiliating.” Guinean officials objected to the overly centralized nature of the system and to France’s prohibition on Guinea negotiating trade agreements independently. Touré's government examined alternative arrangements, including entry into the sterling area and economic cooperation with Ghana.

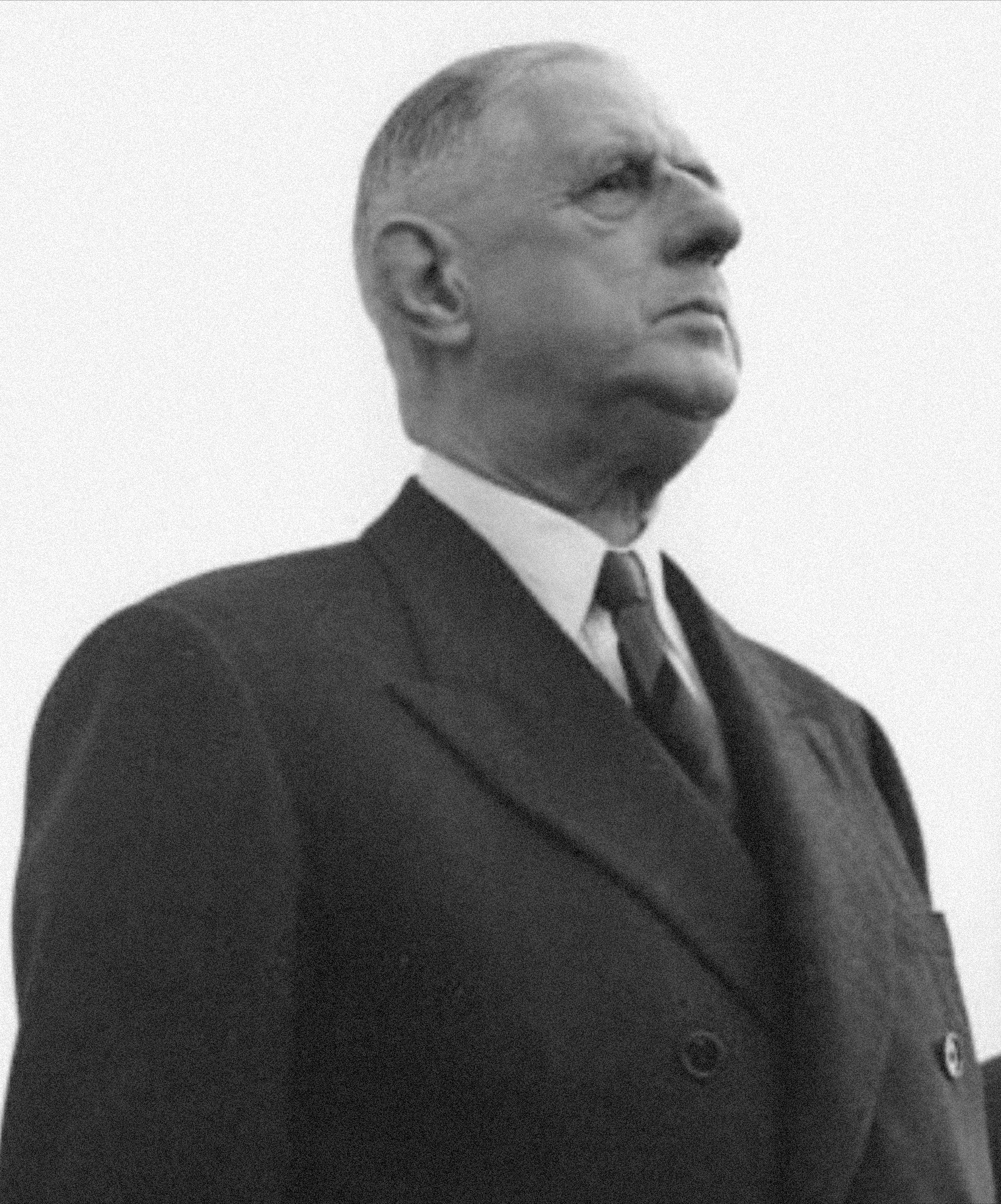
Charles de Gaulle in 1961

Opinions on how to deal with Guinea varied within the French government. The president of France, Charles de Gaulle, reportedly avoided dealing with Touré; however, his advisor Jacques Foccart, who played the most prominent role in the postcolonial French policy in Africa, favored Touré's overthrow. Other French administrators, particularly those in the Ministry of Overseas France, favored reconciliation. The Ministry of Finance also hoped to retain Guinea in the franc zone due to strong French commercial interests, especially the newly opened alumina refinery belonging to Pechiney. Finally, following the refusal of France to reform the statutes that governed the CFA system, on 1 March 1960, Guinea created its own central bank, the Bank of the Republic of Guinea, and an independent currency, the Guinean franc, and left the franc zone. The decree, elaborated in secrecy with the aid of foreign experts, was accompanied by the nationalization of the reserves of the BCEAO office in Conakry. This decision provoked a long crisis between Guinea and France.

The Washington Post later reported that "as a warning to other French-speaking territories, the French pulled out of Guinea over a two-month period, taking everything they could with them. They unscrewed light bulbs, removed plans for sewage pipelines in Conakry, the capital, and even burned medicines rather than leave them for the Guineans." The French government also stopped paying the pensions of Guinean soldiers who had fought for France, and did not support Guinea's accession to the United Nations.

== Arming mercenaries in Dakar ==
According to journalist Georges Chaffard, “An operation aimed at provoking a coup d'état in Conakry, and possibly the physical elimination of the Guinean president, was studied [by the French government] in early 1959." Chaffard revealed that the plan relied on organizing Guinean opponents in exile from Dakar, who would then be trained by paratroopers and non-commissioned officers affiliated with the 11th Shock Parachute Regiment (the armed wing of SDECE).

However, the plan was soon leaked after a senior French official, Albert Chambon, then a diplomatic adviser in Dakar, learnt of it. Convinced the plan risked a major political scandal, Chambon sent a secret telegram to the French Foreign Ministry, alerting it to the existence of a planned coup. The message read:

For Mr. Sebilleau from Mr. Chambon. From a reliable source, I have learned that an operation intended to overthrow the Guinean government has been launched from Senegal. The local representatives of the SDECE have confirmed to me that a team of specialists assigned to this undertaking has arrived in Dakar. In the current political climate, I fear that if this action is not carried out in the utmost secrecy, it will backfire on us and put us in a difficult position at the time of the establishment of the community, and it seems that rumors are already circulating about this in the city.

The message detonated a political storm in Paris, prompting urgent inquiries at the French Ministry of Foreign Affairs and a contentious confrontation between Chambon and then French Minister of Armies Pierre Messmer. Chambon was recalled, and the planned operation was temporarily abandoned. News of the preparations nonetheless reached the press, and, on 6 May 1959, the French satirical newspaper Le Canard Enchaîné published a brief item hinting at an attempted French-backed plot to overthrow Sékou Touré, claiming the scheme had been exposed “at the last minute.”

== Opération Persil ==
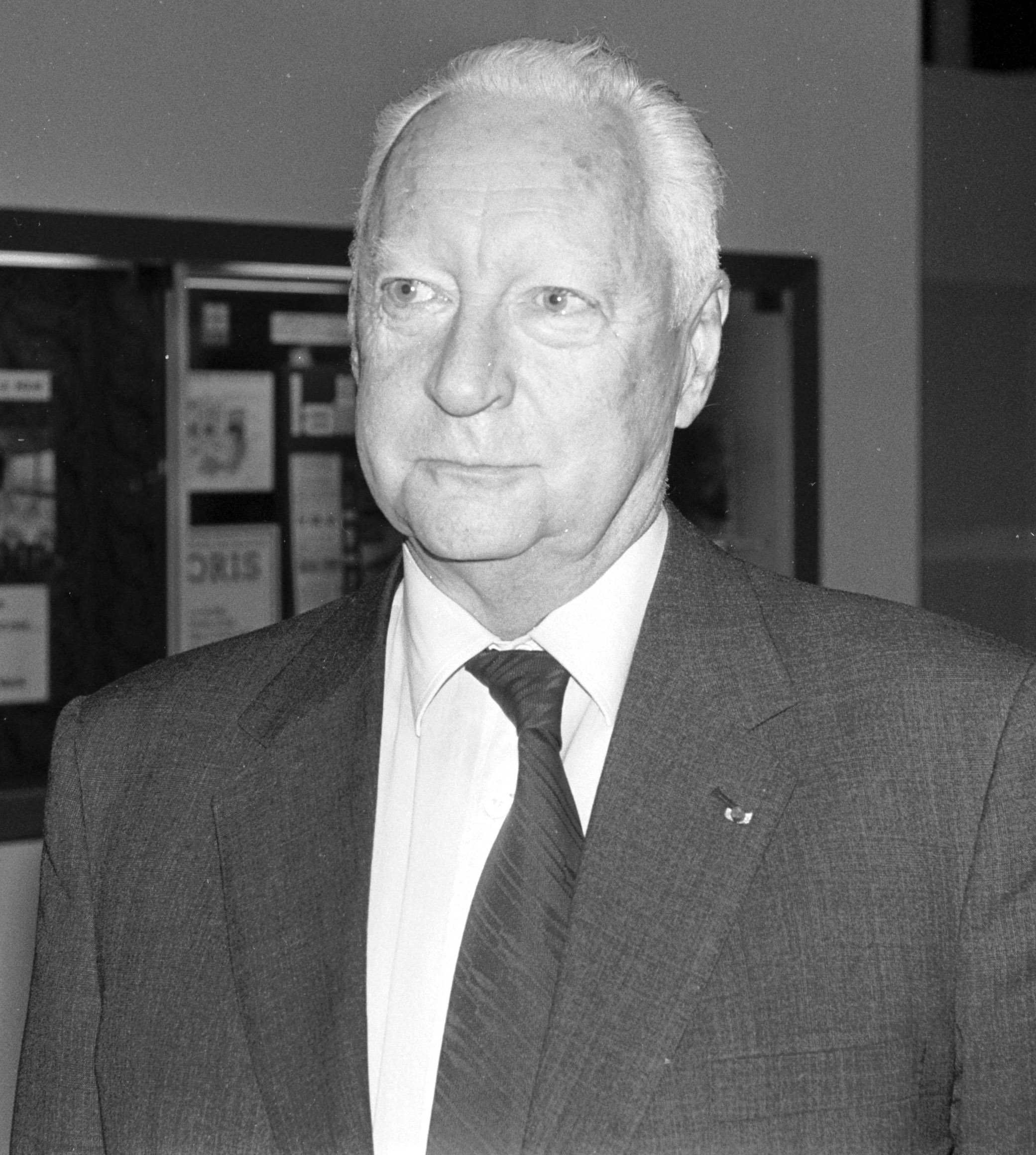
Pierre Messmer

In early 1960, the Guinean government created its own central bank and launched an independent currency, the Guinean Franc. In response, Jacques Foccart, Charles de Gaulle's chief adviser for African matters and co-founder of the Service d'Action Civique militia, alongside Pierre Messmer, drew up covert plans to destabilise Touré's government. The plan was executed with the cooperation of Senegalese President Léopold Sédar Senghor and Ivorian President Félix Houphouët-Boigny. Operation Persil was part of a broader French campaign to destabilize the government of President Ahmed Sékou Touré following Guinea’s withdrawal from the franc zone and the introduction of its own currency, the Guinean franc. The plan was named Opération Persil, after the popular detergent brand Persil, advertised for its excellent ability to wash away dirt.

The operation was provided for the SDECE, based in Senegal, and received directions from SDECE chief General Paul Grossin, to create large quantities of forged Guinean francs to flood the country with and bring about hyperinflation and economic collapse, similar to the Nazi Operation Bernhard. The French-produced banknotes proved more resistant to the humid Guinean climate than the official banknotes produced in Czechoslovakia, which helped land a significant blow to the Guinean economy.

The SDECE also attempted to arm opposition figures in Guinea and organise them into paramilitaries that would lead to civil war. However, the operation suffered a number of leaks, and soon, Guinea issued a number of official complaints against France. On 10 May 1960, the Senegalese police seized a large weapons shipment headed for Guinea—a weapons shipment that had been organised by the French government under Opération Persil. The Senegalese government, headed by Prime Minister Mamadou Dia, launched an official investigation into the affair and sent an official complaint to the French government. The French government later abandoned the operation.

According to Maurice Robert, then director of the SDECE’s African section, France launched a series of covert actions employing local mercenaries “with the aim of creating a climate of insecurity and, if possible, overthrowing Sékou Touré.” Maurice Robert confessed in an interview released in 2004:

We had to destabilize Sékou Touré, make him vulnerable and unpopular, and facilitate the opposition's seizure of power. (…) An operation of this scale involves several phases: gathering and analyzing intelligence, developing an action plan based on this intelligence, studying and implementing logistical resources, and adopting measures to carry out the plan. (…) With the help of Guinean exiles who had taken refuge in Senegal, we also organized opposition guerrilla groups in the Fouta Djallon region. These groups were led by French experts in clandestine operations. We armed and trained these Guinean opposition members, many of whom were Fulani, to create a climate of insecurity in Guinea and, if possible, to overthrow Sékou Touré. (…) Among these destabilizing actions, I can cite the “Persil” operation, for example, which consisted of introducing a large quantity of counterfeit Guinean banknotes into the country with the aim of destabilizing the economy.

Robert later described the operation as “a total success,” claiming that Guinea’s already fragile economy “never fully recovered.” He maintained that the goal of Opération Persil was not merely to punish Touré for breaking with France, but to prevent the Soviet Union and other Eastern bloc countries from gaining a foothold in Guinea and using it as a base for spreading communist influence in West Africa.

== Aftermath and legacy ==
The consequences of Opération Persil were long-lasting. Guinea’s currency suffered severe depreciation, and the prices of essential goods rose sharply. Despite these setbacks, the Guinean government maintained its monetary independence, renaming its currency the 'syli' between 1972 and 1986, and refused to rejoin the franc zone. Diplomatic relations between Guinea and France continued to deteriorate and were formally severed in November 1965. They were not restored until 14 July 1975, following the deaths of Charles de Gaulle and his successor Georges Pompidou, and the political departure of Jacques Foccart.

The eventual failure of the operation to overthrow the Guinean government ultimately led to Touré cracking down against political dissidents and those opposed to Guinean independence. It also solidified Touré relationship with the Eastern bloc countries.
