= Hahnemühle =

German paper manufacturer

Hahnemühle FineArt GmbH
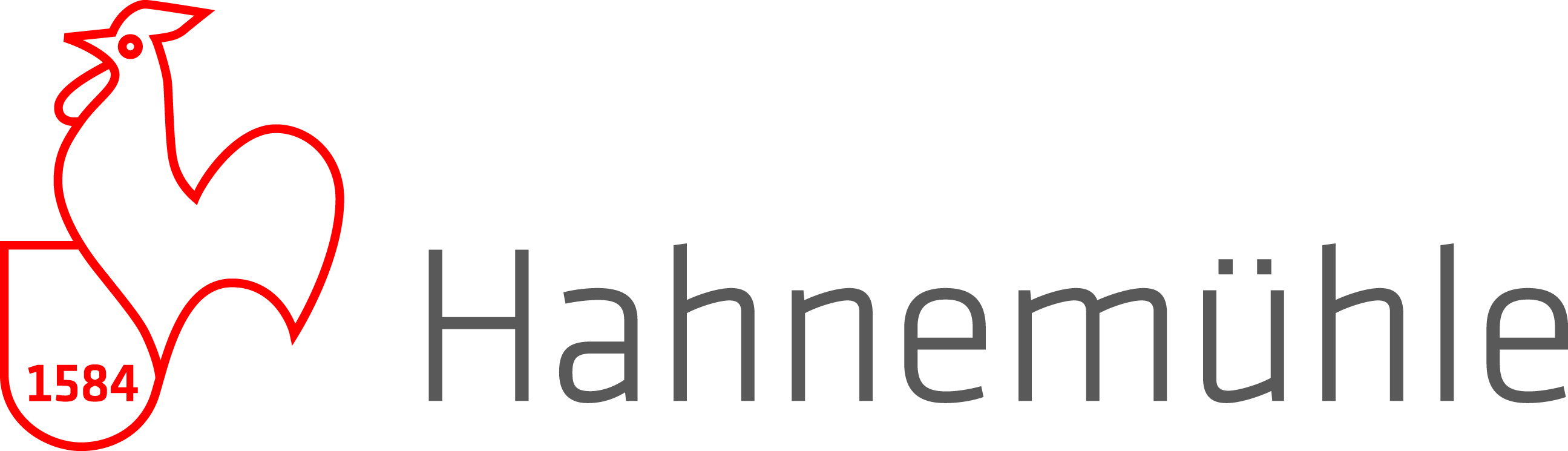
- Type: GmbH
- Industry: Paper manufacturing
- Founded: 1584
- Headquarters: Dassel
- Key people: Jan Wölfle, President & CEO Hahnemühle Group
- Products: Coated inkjet paper, artist paper, filter paper, life science applications
- Operating income: > 38 Million. EUR (2020)
- Number of employees: > 200 (October 2020)

Hahnemühle FineArt, is a paper manufacturing company in the Relliehausen district of Dassel, Germany. It is a significant producer of coated paper for inkjet printing, artist's paper for traditional painting and printing techniques, and filter paper for industry and research. The company traces its origins to a paper mill built in 1584.

== History ==
The company traces its origins to the construction of a paper mill by Merton Speiss on 27 February 1584 in Relliehausen at the source of a river in the Solling (a range of hills). This is but one of many such paper mills known to have existed in the vicinity of Dassel between the Weser and the Leine rivers, but it is the only one to have survived over the centuries.

On 30 August 1769 the descendants of the Spiess family sold the mill to Peter Johann Jacob Heinrich Andrae from Osterode for 4,500 Reichsthaler. Andrae suffered an early death, and the mill passed to his son. On 13 August 1884 Oskar Andrae sold the firm to H. J. Heinemann of Hannover who immediately began the construction of a new production facility. Unforeseen difficulties and costs forced Heinemann to give up the factory, and it was sold in 1886 to Carl Hahne who renamed the mill into “Büttenpapierfabrik Hahnemühle”. In 1902 Hahnemühle was converted into a limited company (GmbH) and merged with Schleicher & Schuell, a company from Düren. In 2004 Hahnemühle was demerged from Schleicher & Schuell and operates independently since then.

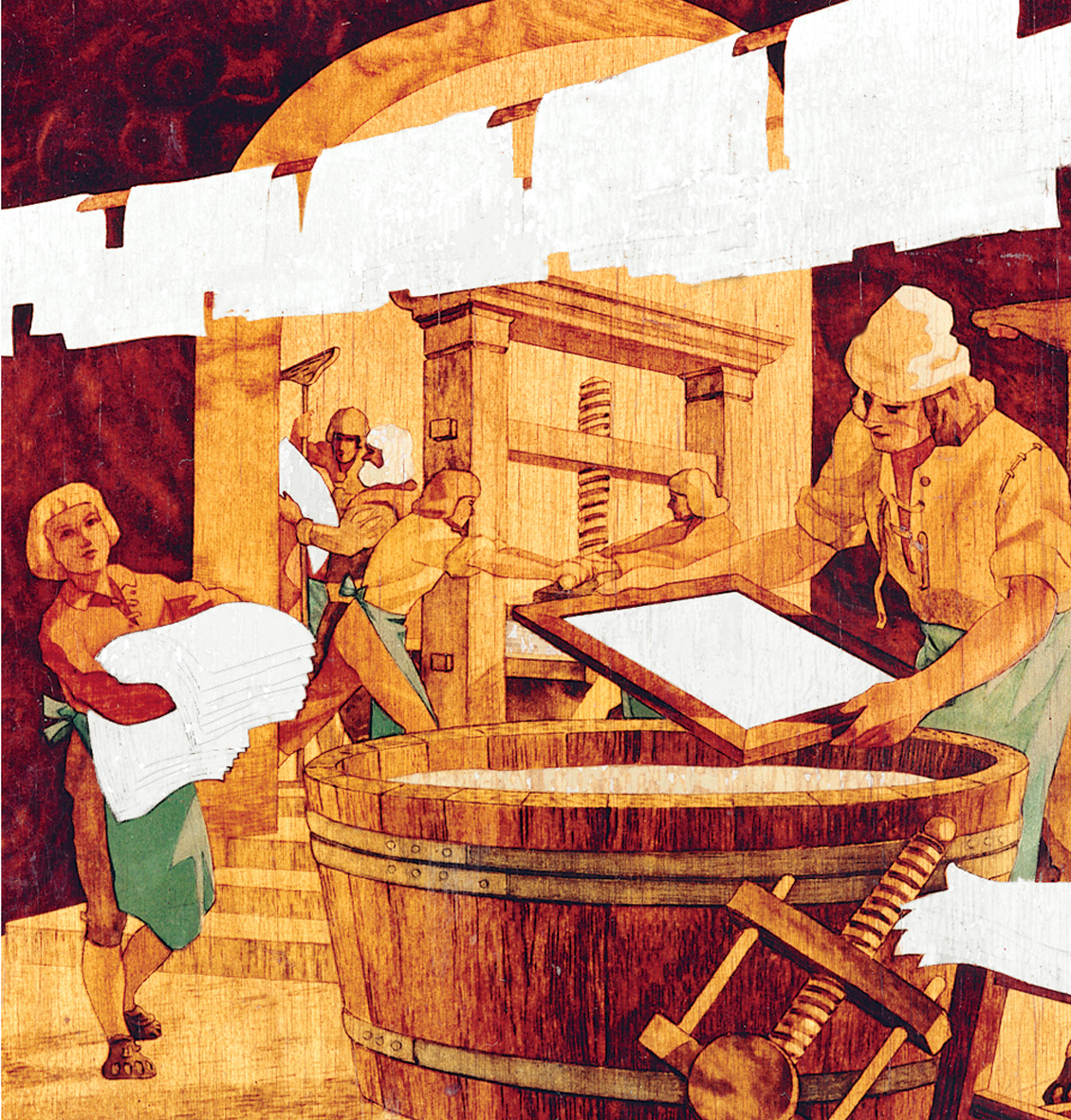
Paper making by hand in the founders' days of Hahnemühle paper mill

During the Second World War, the company created paper for the SS-Reichssicherheitshauptamt's efforts to produce counterfeit British banknotes as part of Operation Bernhard.

Today, the firm employs approximately 200 employees worldwide in the production of paper for painters, graphic artists, illustrators, bookbinders, photographers and printmaker as well as for the production of specialty papers in industrial applications (such as filter membranes for chemical and biological analysis). The paper factory is especially known for its artist papers for painting and printmaking.

Hahnemühle is the inventor of Fine Art InkJet Paper with a special ink-receiving layer surface treatment suitable for today's inkjet printers. This is particularly suitable for photography, computer art, and painting and photo reproductions.
