= Lake Toplitz =

Lake in Styria, Austria

Lake Toplitz Toplitzsee
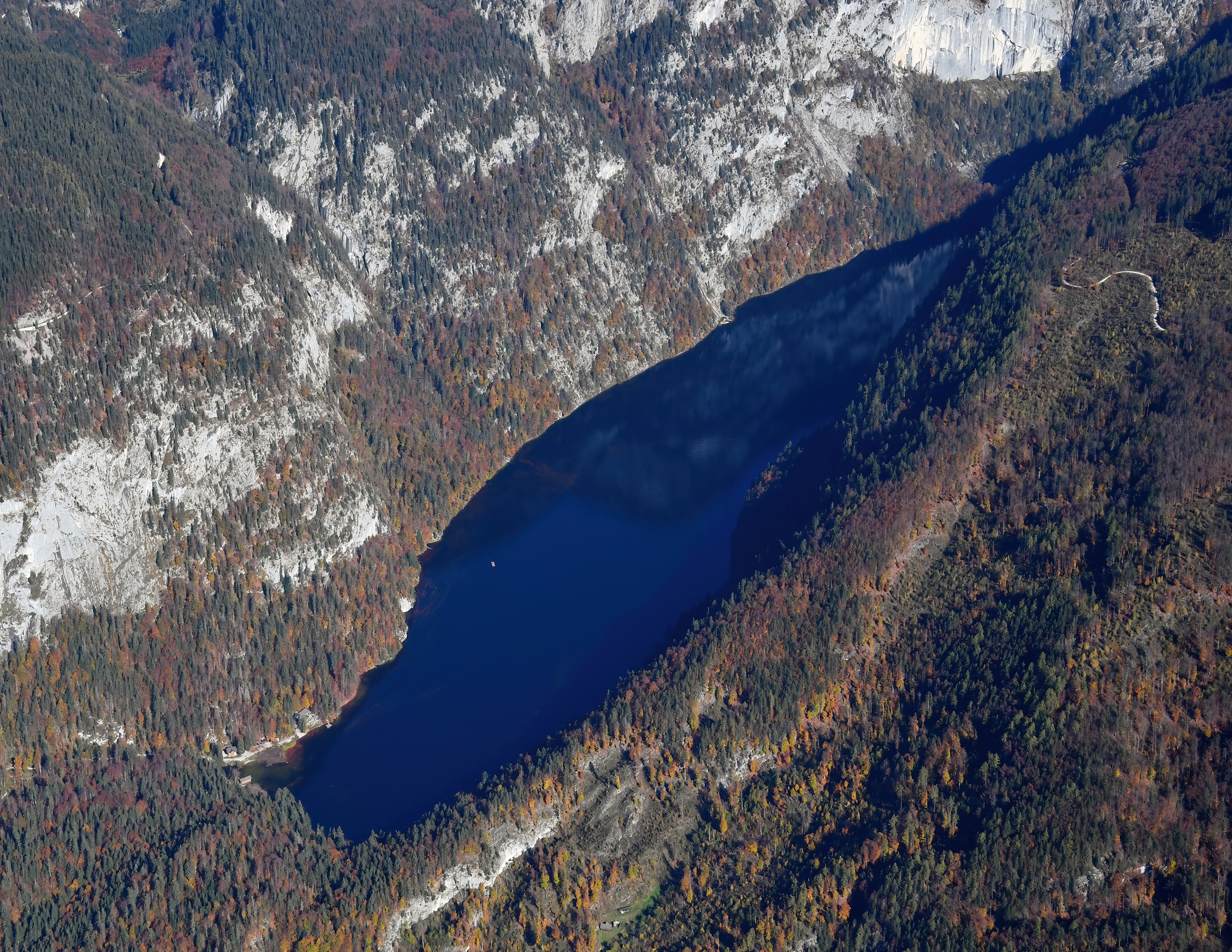

- Location within Austria
- Location: Salzkammergut
- Coordinates: 47°38′30″N 13°55′40″E
- Primary outflows: Toplitz (Austria)^{(de)}
- Basin countries: Austria
- Max. length: 1.9 km (1.2 mi)
- Max. width: 400 m (1,300 ft)
- Max. depth: 103.022 m (338.00 ft)
- Water volume: 33,700,000 m^{3} (1.19×10^{9} cu ft)
- Surface elevation: 718 m (2,356 ft)

Lake Toplitz (German: Toplitzsee) is a lake situated in a dense mountain forest high in the Austrian Alps, 98 km (61 mi) from Salzburg in western Austria. It is surrounded by cliffs and forests in the Salzkammergut lake district, within the Totes Gebirge (dead mountains). The Toplitzsee water contains no dissolved oxygen below a depth of 20 m. Fish can survive only in the top 18 m, as the water below 20 m is salty, although bacteria and worms that can live without oxygen have been found below 20 m.

In 1943 and 1944 during World War II, the shore of Lake Toplitz served as a Nazi naval testing station. Using copper diaphragms, scientists experimented with different explosives, detonating up to 4,000 kg charges at various depths. Over £100 million of counterfeit pound sterling notes were claimed to have been dumped in the lake after Operation Bernhard, which was never fully put into action.

In 1959, investigators recovered £700 million of counterfeit notes from the lake, which Hitler had planned on using to sabotage Britain's economy. There is speculation that there might be other valuables to be recovered from the bottom of the Toplitzsee. There is a layer of sunken logs floating halfway to the bottom of the lake, making diving beyond it hazardous or impossible. Gerhard Zauner, one of the divers on the 1959 expedition, reported that he saw a sunken aircraft below this layer.

The area is only accessible on foot, via a private mile-long track that serves the Fischerhütte (Fisherman's Hut) restaurant at the western end.

== Toplitzsee in fiction ==
Lake Toplitz is mentioned in the scene in the 1964 James Bond movie Goldfinger where Bond receives the gold bar used to tempt Auric Goldfinger (played by Gert Fröbe); the bar is said to have been part of a Nazi hoard that was recovered from the lake. For Fröbe, this was a tongue-in-cheek reference to the 1959 German movie Der Schatz vom Toplitzsee, where he also played the main antagonist – the undercover ex-SS officer who (within the context of Goldfinger) had led both the placement of the Nazi hoard in the lake, and the post-war recovery operation.

In the 1981 TV series Private Schulz, Lake Toplitz serves as a location where 50 million forged British pounds are being dumped by the Nazis; the scene in question, however, was filmed at a reservoir in South Wales.

In the "Nazi Plunder" episode of In Search Of..., it is speculated that Nazis are still secretly hiding treasure under the lake.

The novel The Salzburg Connection by Helen MacInnes involves Nazi secret files found in a lake in similar circumstances to Lake Toplitz (Finstersee). Lake Toplitz is mentioned throughout the book also. Finstersee is the scene of action and is also shown on slides in the movie based on the book.

The novel Not Alone by Craig A. Falconer stated that Nazis hid a flying saucer in the lake along with other artifacts.

In the novel Amber - A Dane and Bones Origins Story, Lake Toplitz is visited by the main characters as part of their search for the Amber Room.
