= Bernhard Krüger =

SS officer (1904–1989)

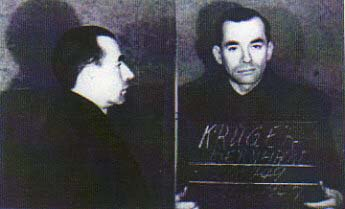
- in captivity after World War II

Personal details
- Born: 26 November 1904 Riesa, Kingdom of Saxony, German Empire
- Died: 3 January 1989 (aged 84) Hamburg, West Germany
- Party: National Socialist German Workers Party (NSDAP)

Military service
- Rank: Sturmbannführer
- Battles/wars: World War II
- Military career
- Allegiance: Nazi Germany (1931–1942)
- Branch: Nazi Party

Bernhard Krüger (German pronunciation: [ˈbɛʁnhaʁt ˈkʁyːɡɐ]; 26 November 1904 – 3 January 1989) was a member of the NSDAP, SS Sturmbannführer (Major) during World War II, and leader of the Department VI F 4a, part of the SD-foreign branch in the Reich Security Main Office (RSHA).

This office of the Nazi Party Security Service (SD) was responsible for, among other things, falsifying passports and documents. Within the setting of Operation Bernhard, the SD forged pound notes in great numbers, funding Nazi Germany with £600 million in high-quality counterfeit currency (worth approx. $6 billion 2009). This counterfeiting operation was named after Krüger, who led the operation from a segregated factory built at Sachsenhausen concentration camp, manned by 142 Jewish inmates.

The pound counterfeiting operation ended in 1944. However Krüger succeeded in establishing a new operation to forge American dollar notes. In May 1945 his team of prisoners were transferred to Ebensee concentration camp in Austria where they were liberated.

One of the forgers, Adolf Burger survived the war and stated that "Major Krüger was in no way like Oskar Schindler. He was a murderer just like everyone else, six weeks before the war ended he had six people shot just because they were sick. He couldn't send them to hospital in case they said something about the operation, so he killed them."

After the war, Major Krüger was detained by the British for two years, then turned over to the French for a year forging documents for them. He was released in 1948 without any charges being pressed, and returned to Germany. In the 1950s, he went before a denazification court, where inmates under his charge at Sachsenhausen provided statements that resulted in his acquittal. He eventually worked for the company that had produced the special paper for the Operation Bernhard forgeries. He died in 1989.

== In popular culture ==
German actor Devid Striesow portrays the character Sturmbannführer Herzog in the movie Die Fälscher ("The Counterfeiters", 2007). Sturmbannführer Herzog is based on the real Bernhard Krüger.
