= Chiemsee Cauldron =

Gold cauldron found in Lake Chiemsee, Bavaria

The Chiemsee Cauldron (German: Chiemsee-Kessel) is a gold cauldron found at the bottom of Lake Chiemsee in Bavaria, Germany, in 2001.

Initially thought to be around 2,000 years old due to its similarity to the Gundestrup cauldron, the Chiemsee cauldron was later attributed to the 20th century though its origins and meaning remain disputed.

Due to the modern attribution, attempts to sell the cauldron as an ancient artefact have been the subject of fraud trials.

== History ==
=== Discovery ===
The Chiemsee Cauldron was discovered in 2001 by Jens Essig, a local diver, at the bottom of Lake Chiemsee, about 200m from the shore near Arlaching, Chieming municipality.

The cauldron has a diameter of 50 centimetres (20 in) and a height of 30 centimetres (12 in), and is made from 10.89 kilograms (24.0 lb) of 18 carat gold.

=== Attribution ===
The cauldron was initially suspected to be 2,000 years old, judging by its Celtic-style decoration and its similarity to the Gundestrup cauldron. However, when the artifact was passed along to Ludwig Wamser of the Bavarian State Archaeological Collection to be analyzed, it was identified as a 20th-century creation, possibly from the Nazi era. Because of this association with the Nazis, the cauldron was then dubbed "Hitler's bedpan" (Hitlers Nachttopf) by the media.

There was a suggestion "that it had been made on the orders of Hitler’s ideologist Alfred Rosenberg, who was planning to set up a Nazi education center near Chiemsee. Rosenberg drew inspiration from mythology, believing that the Germans were descended from a Nordic race..." A Nazi attribution was also confirmed by a senior director of the Munich jeweler's company, Theodor Heiden, who stated that the company's goldsmith, Alfred Notz, before his death in the 1960s, had told him about a "golden cauldron weighing more than 10 kg, with a figurative ornament and manufactured by means of the paddle and anvil technique," which had been manufactured in the company's workshop between 1925 and 1939.

According to Notz, the cauldron was created at the request of the Munich company Elektrochemische Werke München. Albert Pietzsch, director of Elektrochemische Werke München, had been in personal contact with Adolf Hitler from 1920, and was known to have provided him with generous donations. He became a member of the Nazi Party in 1927 and rose to the position of Military Economy Leader and president of the Reich Chamber of Commerce. He survived the war and died in 1957.

In an interview with National Geographic, jeweller Maximillian Heiden opined that Otto Gahr, a Nazi Party member, silversmith and favoured jeweller to the Nazi elite, would have been the obvious choice for such a project. According to Heiden, Otto Gahr, primarily a silversmith, probably sought out Alfred Notz for his expertise in working with gold.

Furthermore, Nazi documents dated April 1945 were discovered among items once belonging to Heinrich Himmler in an attic in Germany in 2011. The papers, which appear to be a movement order for thirty-five items, ranging from gold and silver to precious stones, list a "gold cauldron/Celtic" along with the name "Otto Gahr" and "Munich".

=== Sale and fraud trials ===
The Bavarian state and the finder agreed to sell the find on the open market and share the proceeds. The cauldron was bought by an investor for EUR 300,000, at the time about twice the market value of the gold.

The buyer, a Swiss entrepreneur, tried to attract investors by claiming that the cauldron was a genuine antique, and that it had a market value of between €250 and €350 million. Investors from Kazakhstan, taken in by these claims, filed suit against the Swiss businessman in 2006. The cauldron was confiscated by the Zürich authorities in 2007, and a fraud trial began on 27 October 2010. As the trial opened, the defendant claimed to have found a new buyer for the cauldron who was prepared to pay 7 million Swiss francs, which would allow him to satisfy all claims against his firm.

An expert witness report from Oxford metallurgist Peter Northover concluded that "the cauldron was made by or under the direction of someone who knew about the Gundestrup vessel, i.e. after 1891."

In 2015, Josef Hatzenbuehler, who had purchased the cauldron at a bankruptcy auction in 2014 for 965,000 Swiss francs, or about $1.1 million, filed suit in Texas against Essig, who had convinced Hatzenbuehler that the cauldron was a genuine ancient artefact. Hatzenbuehler said that he had signed an agreement with Essig that would give Essig 50% of the profits in the case of the resale of the cauldron, in exchange for being able to participate in the bankruptcy auction. Hatzenbuehler alleged that Essig was falsely claiming ownership of the artefact and demanding its return to him. Hatzenbuehler's lawyer remarked that if the cauldron was a 20th century artefact, "then it's probably worth only $400,000."

== See also ==
- Nazi gold
- Lake Toplitz
- Nazi dental gold
- Nazi gold train
