= Štěchovice treasure =

Purported hoard of Nazi treasure

The Štěchovice treasure is a hoax regarding a purported hoard of Nazi treasure. It is said to be hidden in the market town of Štěchovice in the Central Bohemian Region of the Czech Republic.

The story says that Emil Klein, a Nazi general, buried war booty in tunnels in Hradištko near Štěchovice. The booty included gold, diamonds, jewelry and pieces of art as well as secret files and scientific documents from the Kaiser Wilhelm Institute. Based on documents found in 1993 in the Weimar area, some experts believe that the Nazis hid the stolen goods and the missing Russian "Amber Room" in these tunnels.

Only one person, German Helmut Gaensel, claims that he possesses the original documents about the contents and has exact knowledge of the location where this alleged treasure is hidden. He says that he received these documents, additional information and a specific area map from Emil Klein, the former SS general in command. Mr. Gaensel worked for the Czech and other secret services and was involved in matters connected with this treasure. In 1964, he arranged the release of Klein from the KZ Valdice prison in Czechoslovakia. During the 1970s, and as late as 1989, there were some attempts to recover the Štěchovice treasure under the control of the Ministries of Interior and Defence. The last efforts were carried out before the revolution by the foreign trade company Omnipol, which traded mainly in weapons. In 1992, Gaensel bought the relevant property and signed an exclusive agreement with the Czech authorities to obtain the sole rights to unveil the treasure.

In a November 2022 interview with the Czech-language Seznam Zprávy website, Gaensel admitted to having invented the story of the treasure hoard.

== See also ==
- List of missing treasure
- Nazi gold
- Nazi plunder
- Treasure trove
