= Alperin v. Vatican Bank =

1999 class action lawsuit in California

- Court: United States Court of Appeals for the Ninth Circuit
- Full case name: Alperin, et al. v. Vatican Bank
- Citations: 104 F.3d 1086 (9th Cir. 1997), 284 F.3d 1114 (9th Cir. 2002), 266 F.3d 1155 (9th Cir. 2001)
- Transcript

Keywords
- Holocaust survivors, political question

Alperin v. Vatican Bank was an unsuccessful class action lawsuit filed by Holocaust survivors against the Institute for the Works of Religion ("Vatican Bank" or "IOR") and the Franciscan Order ("Order of Friars Minor"). The case was filed in San Francisco, California on November 15, 1999.

The suit alleged that the Vatican Bank and the Franciscans accepted and laundered assets looted by the Ustaše regime in Croatia during World War II. The case was initially dismissed in 2003 by the United States District Court for the Northern District of California on the grounds that it presented a political question. However, in 2005, the United States Court of Appeals for the Ninth Circuit reinstated part of the case, drawing attention for its treatment of claims under the Alien Tort Claims Act (ATCA) and the Foreign Sovereign Immunities Act (FSIA).

In 2007, part of the complaint against the Vatican Bank was dismissed on the basis of sovereign immunity, and the remaining claims against the bank were dismissed due to lack of a sufficient connection (nexus) to the United States. The Ninth Circuit upheld that decision in February 2010.

By that point, only the Franciscan Order remained as a defendant. In March 2011, the Ninth Circuit affirmed the district court's dismissal of the claims against the Franciscans. The case was not appealed further. As a result, no part of the lawsuit ever proceeded to trial, and none of the plaintiffs' allegations were established in court.

== Historical context ==
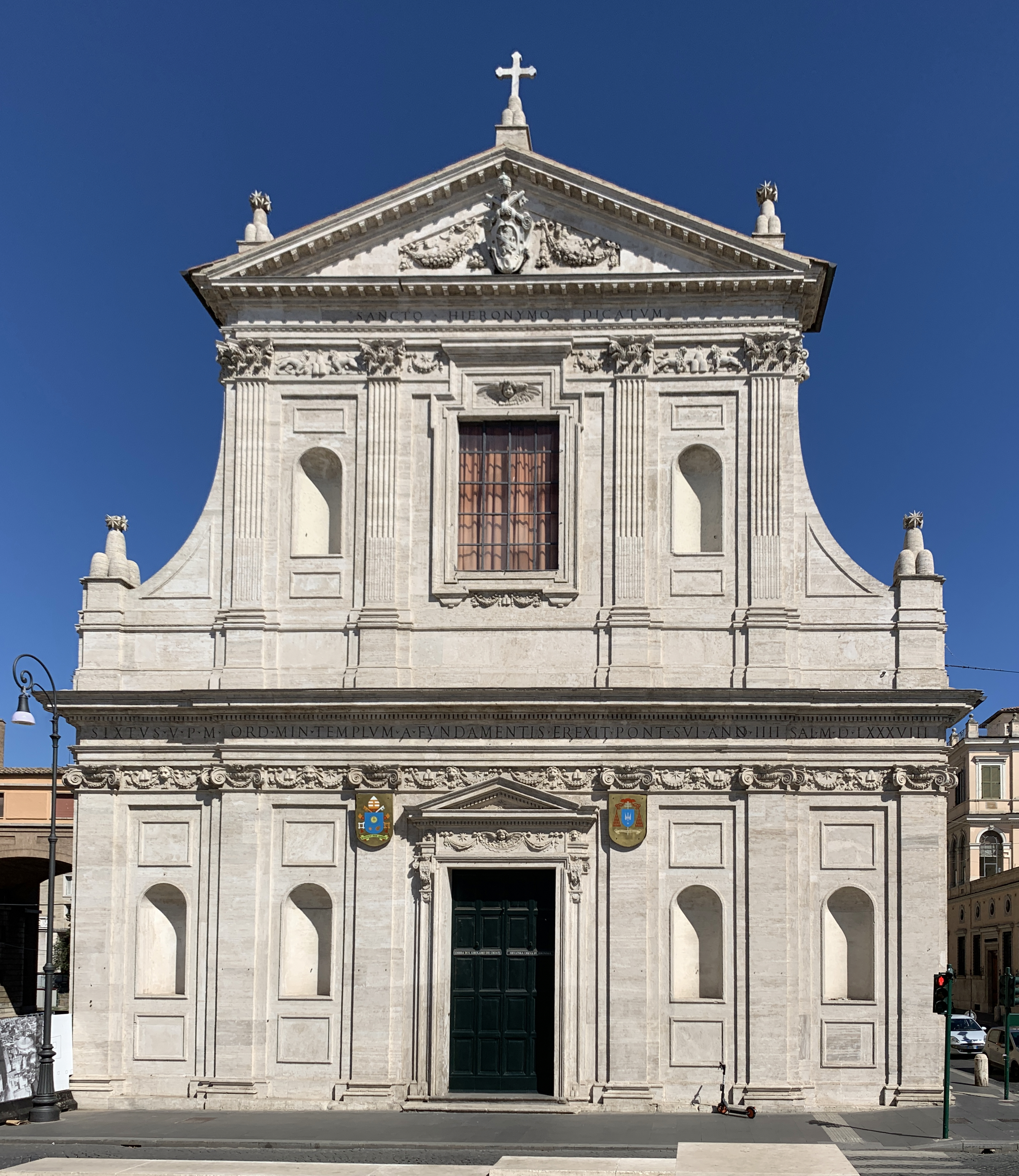
The Pontifical Croatian College of St. Jerome in Rome

The factual background alleged in the claim was that members of the Ustaše, a Croatian fascist organization, hid a large amount of looted gold at the Pontifical Croatian College of St. Jerome (the Croatian Seminary near the Vatican) and that it was later moved to other Vatican extraterritorial property and/or the Vatican Bank. Although this gold would be worth hundreds of thousands of 2008 US dollars, it allegedly constituted only a small percentage of the gold looted during World War II, most of which was taken by the Nazis. According to Phayer, "top Vatican personnel would have known the whereabouts of the gold", although he provides no evidence to support this claim and does not name any individuals who may have been involved.

The lawsuit was made possible by a 1997 executive order issued by U.S. President Bill Clinton, which directed all branches of the U.S. government to open their World War II records to public scrutiny. The order was issued in the aftermath of evidence that Swiss banks had been destroying records of Jewish deposits. Fourteen European nations, Canada, and Argentina followed suit, but Vatican City did not. Much of the evidence that has come to light since the executive order was issued was not available to the Tripartite Commission for the Restitution of Monetary Gold before it disbanded. However, Yugoslavia was among the recipients of restitution.

== Arguments ==
=== Plaintiffs ===
The class action was brought on behalf of "all Serbs, Jews, and former Soviet Union citizens (and their heirs and beneficiaries) who suffered" at the hands of the Ustaše. The named plaintiffs claimed to be victims of personal or property crimes committed by the Ustaše. Four organizations representing Holocaust survivors or human rights issues were named as plaintiffs. Surviving victims of the Ustaše and their next of kin living in California brought a class action suit against the Vatican Bank and others in U.S. federal court, Alperin v. Vatican Bank. However, the total potential class, had the Court recognized the claim, would have included "over 300,000 former slave and forced laborers, prisoners, concentration camp, and ghetto survivors".

The causes of action included "conversion, unjust enrichment, restitution, the right to an accounting, human rights violations, and violations of international law". Subject-matter jurisdiction was asserted under federal law, California state law, international law, and common law. According to plaintiffs, the defendants "accepted, concealed, hypothecated, laundered, retained, converted and profited from assets looted by the Ustasha Regime during April 1941 through May 1945 and deposited in, or converted, concealed, hypothecated, trafficked, credited, pledged, exchanged, laundered or liquidated through, the IOR, and OFM after the demise of the NDH-Independent State of Croatia in May 1945. 2007 U.S. Dist. LEXIS 95529, ND CA 2007." Specifically, the Vatican Bank was alleged to have laundered and converted "the Ustaša treasury, making deposits in Europe and North and South America, [and] distributing the funds to exiled Ustaša leaders including Pavelić". Since the case was dismissed at a preliminary stage, these claims were never proven.

A principal piece of evidence against the Vatican was to have been the "Bigelow dispatch", an October 16, 1946 dispatch from Emerson Bigelow in Rome to Harold Glasser, the director of monetary research for the U.S. Treasury Department. Former OSS agent William Gowen also gave a deposition as an expert witness that in 1946, Colonel Ivan Babić transported 10 truckloads of gold from Switzerland to the Pontifical College.

The plaintiffs sought an accounting and restitution of the Ustaše treasury, which, according to the U.S. State Department, had allegedly been transferred illicitly to the Vatican, the Franciscan Order, and other banks after the end of the war, in order to further the goals of the Ustaše regime in exile and fund the Vatican ratlines. The principal figures allegedly involved were Fr. Krunoslav Draganović, Fr. Dominik Mandić OFM, and the war criminal Ante Pavelić.

=== Defendants ===
The named defendants included the Vatican Bank, but not Vatican City (since naming Vatican City could have led to the dismissal of the suit on the grounds of sovereign immunity). The Ninth Circuit accepted, for the purposes of the motion to dismiss, the plaintiffs' argument that Vatican City and the Vatican Bank are separate institutions. Other named defendants included the Order of Friars Minor ("Franciscans"), the Croatian Liberation Movement, and "other unknown Catholic religious organizations and known and unknown banking institutions from a variety of countries". The Vatican Bank and the Order of Friars Minor filed separate motions to dismiss.

The Vatican's lawyers did not contest the allegation that a large shipment of gold arrived by truck in Rome in 1946, although they did assert that the plaintiffs had "put forward conclusory 'facts'". However, the defense argued that there was "no evidentiary connection between the losses of the plaintiffs and the gold deposited in the Vatican Bank".

The defendants also argued that, under the Foreign Sovereign Immunities Act (with Vatican sovereignty recognized by the U.S. in 1984), they had no obligation to return the looted Ustaše gold to Yugoslavia in 1946, since the country was ruled by a hostile Communist regime. They argued:

The decision by a sovereign instrumentality to give funds to a foreign anti-Communist political movement rather than to a Communist regime, at the time where the Cold War was beginning in earnest in Europe, is not a "commercial" act; it is jure imperii, a deeply sovereign act.

Finally, the defendants argued that the plaintiffs did not have standing because the Vatican was merely a third party to the plaintiffs' injury.

== Disposition ==
=== First District Court ruling (2003) ===
The original lawsuit was filed in the District Court for the Northern District of California in San Francisco in 1999. The parties agreed in the district court to limit their initial arguments to the question of whether the case constituted a political question. The district judge dismissed the case in 2003 on the grounds that it constituted a political question. In a separate opinion, the district court dismissed the claims against the Croatian Liberation Movement for lack of personal jurisdiction.

=== First Ninth Circuit appeal (2005) ===
The Court of Appeals for the Ninth Circuit reinstated some of the plaintiffs' claims in 2005, and the Supreme Court declined in January 2006 to grant certiorari to review that ruling. The Ninth Circuit held that the property claims were not political questions, while it agreed that the "war objectives claims" (including human rights violations, violations of international law, and slave labor) were political questions.

The Ninth Circuit wrote that because the case "touched on foreign relations and potentially controversial political issues, it [was] tempting to jump to the conclusion that such claims are barred by the political question doctrine", but that the court should "scrutinize each claim individually" rather than "abdicate the court's Article III responsibility". The Ninth Circuit also determined that the U.S. government had not yet taken a position on the issue and that it was not the subject of a treaty or executive agreement. The Ninth Circuit distinguished the case from Kadic v. Karadzic because "the claims in Kadic focused on the acts of a single individual during a localized conflict rather than asking the court to undertake the complex calculus of assigning fault for actions taken by a foreign regime during the morass of a world war".

Although the Ninth Circuit allowed the plaintiffs to proceed with their claims of conversion, unjust enrichment, restitution, and an accounting against the Vatican Bank, it agreed to the dismissal of the claims against the Croatian Liberation Movement and the claim that the Vatican Bank supported the Ustaše in committing genocide and other war crimes. The majority opinion was written by Judge M. Margaret McKeown, with Senior Judge Milton Irving Shadur concurring. Judge Stephen S. Trott dissented in part, arguing that the district court had correctly dismissed the case. Trott wrote: "What the majority has unintentionally accomplished in embracing this case is nothing less than the wholesale creation of a World Court, an international tribunal with breathtaking and limitless jurisdiction to entertain the World's failures, no matter where they happen, when they happen, to whom they happen, the identity of the wrongdoer, and the sovereignty of one of the parties."

=== Second Ninth Circuit appeal (2009) ===
The second Ninth Circuit appeal on the issue of sovereign immunity of the Vatican Bank was heard on December 10, 2009, in San Francisco. The case was dismissed on December 28, 2009. Plaintiffs indicated they might appeal further.

=== Later District Court rulings (2006–2009) ===
On June 15, 2006, Judge Elizabeth Laporte of the Northern District of California denied without prejudice the plaintiffs' motion for jurisdictional discovery and granted in part the plaintiffs' motion to provide materials pursuant to the Federal Rules of Civil Procedure. On December 27, 2007, Judge Maxine M. Chesney granted the Vatican Bank's motion to dismiss the fourth amended complaint, effectively ending the case against the Vatican Bank on the basis of sovereign immunity. On April 14, 2009, Judge Chesney granted the plaintiffs' motion for leave to file a sixth amended complaint no later than May 1, 2009. The sixth amended complaint was filed, naming the Franciscan Order as a defendant and removing the Vatican Bank. On September 11, 2009, the district court dismissed the case against the Franciscans without prejudice on grounds of lack of federal jurisdiction and denied the plaintiffs' motion to amend the complaint on November 13, 2009. Plaintiffs appealed this decision to the Ninth Circuit on the grounds that the Vatican Bank engages in commercial activity in the United States but lost the appeal.

=== Complaint to European Central Bank (2010) ===
On July 1, 2010, the plaintiffs submitted a request for the European Central Bank to initiate an investigation into Vatican Bank money laundering and dealings in Nazi gold. They based this request on Article 8 of the Monetary Agreement between the European Union and the Vatican City State, which forbids euro-issuing entities from engaging in money laundering.

== Legal analysis ==
The initial dismissal of the case on the political question doctrine was an extension of the precedent set in Baker v. Carr. According to Prof. Gwynne Skinner, "most of the claims arising out of the Holocaust have been dismissed based on this doctrine, either because decisions were already made regarding reparations or because the Allied forces had already made decisions about who would be prosecuted for the various crimes committed during the Holocaust". According to Prof. Hannibal Travis: "Initially, U.S. courts dismissed claims by Holocaust survivors on the grounds that international law only gave rise to claims between states and was not self-executing in the absence of implementing legislation by Congress. This erroneous interpretation of §1350 was corrected within a few years, and since 1980, U.S. federal courts have exercised universal jurisdiction in a nearly unbroken line of cases involving offenses properly alleged to have been committed elsewhere in violation of international law."

The case has been compared to several other 2003 lawsuits against private actors for wrongs committed during World War II, such as Anderman v. Federal Republic of Austria (also determined to be a political question). It has been cited as an example of an Alien Tort Claims Act (ATCA) case where the courts did not require the exhaustion of foreign legal remedies. The Ninth Circuit decision has been criticized by the Golden Gate University Law Review on the grounds that: "while the court's demarcation between property claims and war objectives claims may be a sound analytical method for addressing political question doctrine issues, the slave labor claims should not have been excluded from the scope of the property claims".

The plaintiffs attempted to coordinate with pending Catholic sex abuse cases to "avoid divergent findings on the issue of Vatican amenability to suit in the United States." The precedent from the 2005 appellate court ruling has already been applied in Mujica v. Occidental Petroleum Corporation.

== See also ==
- Republic of Austria v. Altmann
- John V. Doe v. Holy See
- Legal status of the Holy See
- List of class-action lawsuits

== Bibliography ==
- Phayer, Michael. 2008. Pius XII, The Holocaust, and the Cold War. Indianapolis: Indiana University Press.
