= Emerson Bigelow =

American financial analyst and consultant

Emerson Bigelow (January 26, 1896 – January 11, 1966) was an American financial analyst and a consultant on financial matters in the Office of Strategic Services, best known for the Bigelow memo. In 1997, the memo was released to two television producers who were preparing a documentary on Switzerland's handling of Nazi gold during and after the Second World War.
