= Doe v. Holy See =

Lawsuit against the Catholic Church

- Court: United States Court of Appeals for the Ninth Circuit
- Full case name: John V. Doe v. Holy See
- Argued: March 5, 2008
- Decided: March 3, 2009
- Citation: 557 F.3d 1066 (9th Cir. 2009)

Case history
- Prior history: 434 F. Supp. 2d 925 (D. Or. 2006)
- Subsequent history: Cert. denied, 561 U.S. 1024 (2010); motion to dismiss granted, No. 3:02-cv-00430 (Aug. 20, 2012).

Court membership
- Judges sitting: Ferdinand F. Fernandez, Marsha Berzon, Otis D. Wright II (C.D. Cal.)

Case opinions
- Per curiam
- Concurrence: Fernandez
- Concur/dissent: Berzon

Doe v. Holy See, 557 F.3d 1066 (9th Cir. 2009), was a lawsuit involving the sovereign immunity status of the Holy See in relation to the Catholic sexual abuse scandal in the United States. The threshold question of law in the case was whether the Foreign Sovereign Immunities Act allows the Holy See, a sovereign state in international law, to be sued for acts of local Catholic clergy.

U.S. District Court Judge Michael Mosman ruled that the Holy See cannot be held liable because there was no relationship of employment in the case. Jeff Anderson, attorney for the plaintiff, said he would appeal the decision. The case was finally dismissed in August 2013.

== Case history ==
The lawsuit was brought in federal court in Oregon by Kevin K. Strever, William A. Barton, and Jeffrey R. Anderson; the plaintiff John Doe alleged abuse by Father Andrew Ronan OSM in Portland, Oregon. This allegedly took place c. 1965 after Ronan was moved from Ireland after admitting abuse there. Doe alleged, inter alia, "that the Archdiocese and the Order were vicariously liable for Ronan’s abuse of Doe, and that ... the Holy See was vicariously liable for Ronan's abuse of Doe and for the negligent actions of the Archdiocese, the Order, and the Chicago Bishop, and that the Holy See was itself negligent in its retention and supervision of Ronan and in failing to warn of his propensities."

The Holy See moved to dismiss the claims against it, invoking its immunity under the Foreign Sovereign Immunities Act. When the District Court rejected that motion, the defendant took an interlocutory appeal. A divided Ninth Circuit panel affirmed the judgment of the district court, and in June 2010, the Supreme Court of the United States denied certiorari, sending the case back to the District Court for further proceedings.

== Merits ==
Roman canonists have stated before that the Second Vatican Council and 1983 Code of Canon Law gave full authority to bishops within their capacities as diocesan administrators.

In 2011, Jeffrey S. Lena, Counsel for the Holy See, published the entire documentation held by the Roman Curia concerning the case, showing that the Holy See was informed of Ronan's misconduct only in February 1966, the year after the abuse that was the basis of the accusation of Holy See involvement, and that the Holy See thereupon laicized him within weeks.

Lena commented: "The plaintiff's lawyers never had support for their calumnious accusations against the Holy See. They have nonetheless chosen to misuse the legal system as a vehicle to pursue a broader agenda – a decision that has misled the public and wasted considerable resources."

Lena also remarked that the release of the documentation should "give pause to those persons, who all too willingly engage in sensational and intemperate comment without bothering to acquire a sound grasp of the facts".

== Proceedings on remand ==
U.S. District Judge Michael Mosman ruled that the Holy See cannot be held liable because there was no relationship of employment in the case. Jeff Anderson, attorney for the plaintiff, said he would appeal the decision. The case was dismissed in August 2013.

== See also ==
- Alperin v. Vatican Bank
- Legal status of the Holy See
