= Amber Room =

Decorated imperial chamber

- Bernsteinzimmer (German), Янтарная комната (Yantarnaya Komnata) (Russian)
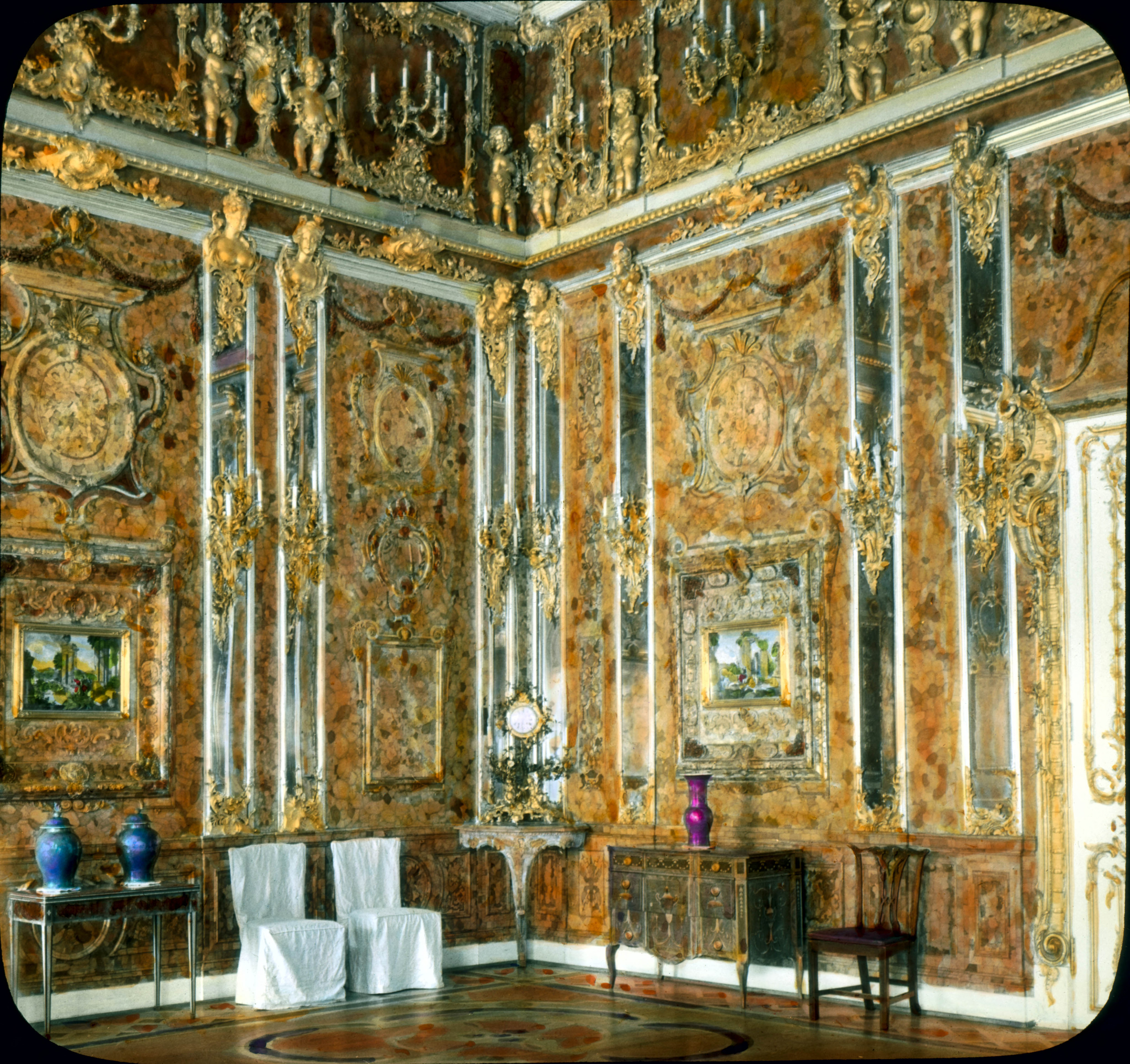
- Hand-coloured photograph of the original Amber Room, 1931
- Artists: Andreas Schlüter, Gottfried Wolfram
- Completion date: 1712
- Medium: Amber, gold leaf, gemstone, mirror
- Movement: Classicism
- Weight: 6 tonnes (13,000 lb)
- Condition: reconstruction
- Location: Catherine Palace, Pushkin, Saint Petersburg; 59°42′57″N 30°23′44″E
- Owner: Russian Federation
- Website: amberroom.ru

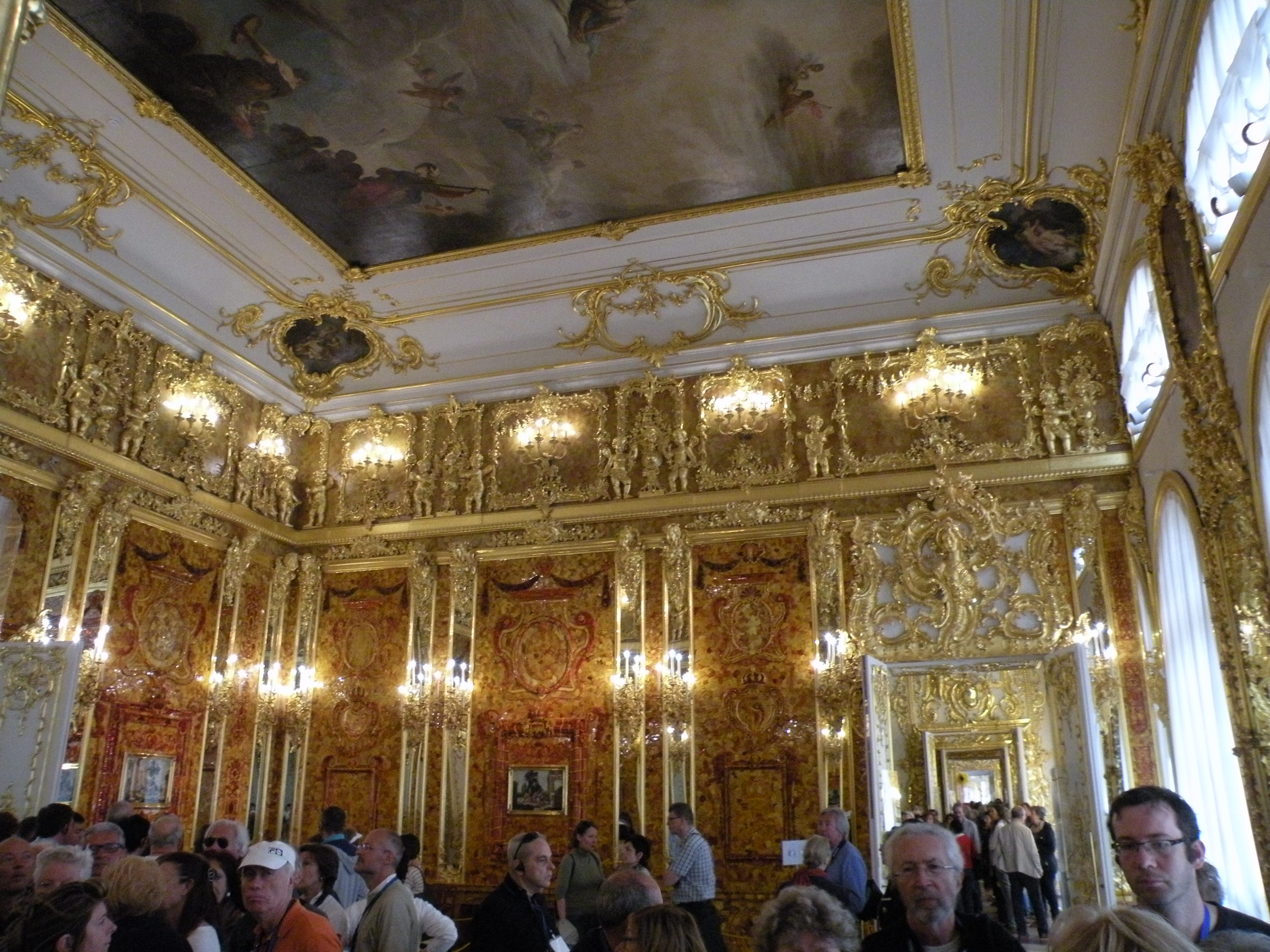
Reconstructed Amber Room, 2003

The Amber Room (German: Bernsteinzimmer; Russian: Янтарная комната, romanized: Yantarnaya Komnata) was a chamber decorated in amber panels backed with gold leaf and mirrors, located in the Catherine Palace of Tsarskoye Selo near Saint Petersburg.

Constructed in the 18th century in Prussia, the room was dismantled and eventually disappeared during World War II. Before its loss, it was considered an "Eighth Wonder of the World". A reconstruction was made, starting in 1979 and completed and installed in the Catherine Palace in 2003.

The Amber Room was intended in 1701 for the Charlottenburg Palace, in Berlin, Prussia, but was eventually installed at the Berlin City Palace. It was designed by German baroque sculptor Andreas Schlüter and Danish amber craftsman Gottfried Wolfram. Schlüter and Wolfram worked on the room until 1707, when work was continued by amber masters Gottfried Turau and Ernst Schacht from Danzig (Gdańsk).

It remained in Berlin until 1716, when it was given by the Prussian King Frederick William I to his ally Tsar Peter the Great of the Russian Empire. In Russia, the room was installed in the Catherine Palace. After expansion and several renovations, it covered more than 55 square metres (590 ft^{2}) and contained over 6 tonnes (13,000 lb) of amber.

The Amber Room was looted during World War II by the Army Group North of Nazi Germany, and taken to Königsberg for reconstruction and display. Some time in early 1944, with Allied forces closing in on Germany, the room was disassembled and crated for storage in the Castle basement. Königsberg was destroyed by Allied bombers in August 1944 and documentation of the room location ends there. Its eventual fate and current whereabouts, if it survived, remain a mystery. In 1979, the decision was taken to create a reconstructed Amber Room at the Catherine Palace in Pushkin. After decades of work by Russian craftsmen and donations from Germany, it was completed and inaugurated in 2003.

== Architecture ==
The Amber Room is a priceless piece of art, with extraordinary architectural features, such as gilding, carvings, 450 kg (990 lb) of amber panels, gold leaf, gemstones, and mirrors, all highlighted with candlelight. Additional architectural and design features include statues of angels and children.

Because of its unique features and singular beauty, the original Amber Room was sometimes dubbed the "Eighth Wonder of the World". Modern estimates of the room's value range from $142 million (2007) to over $500 million (2016).

== History ==
=== Creation ===
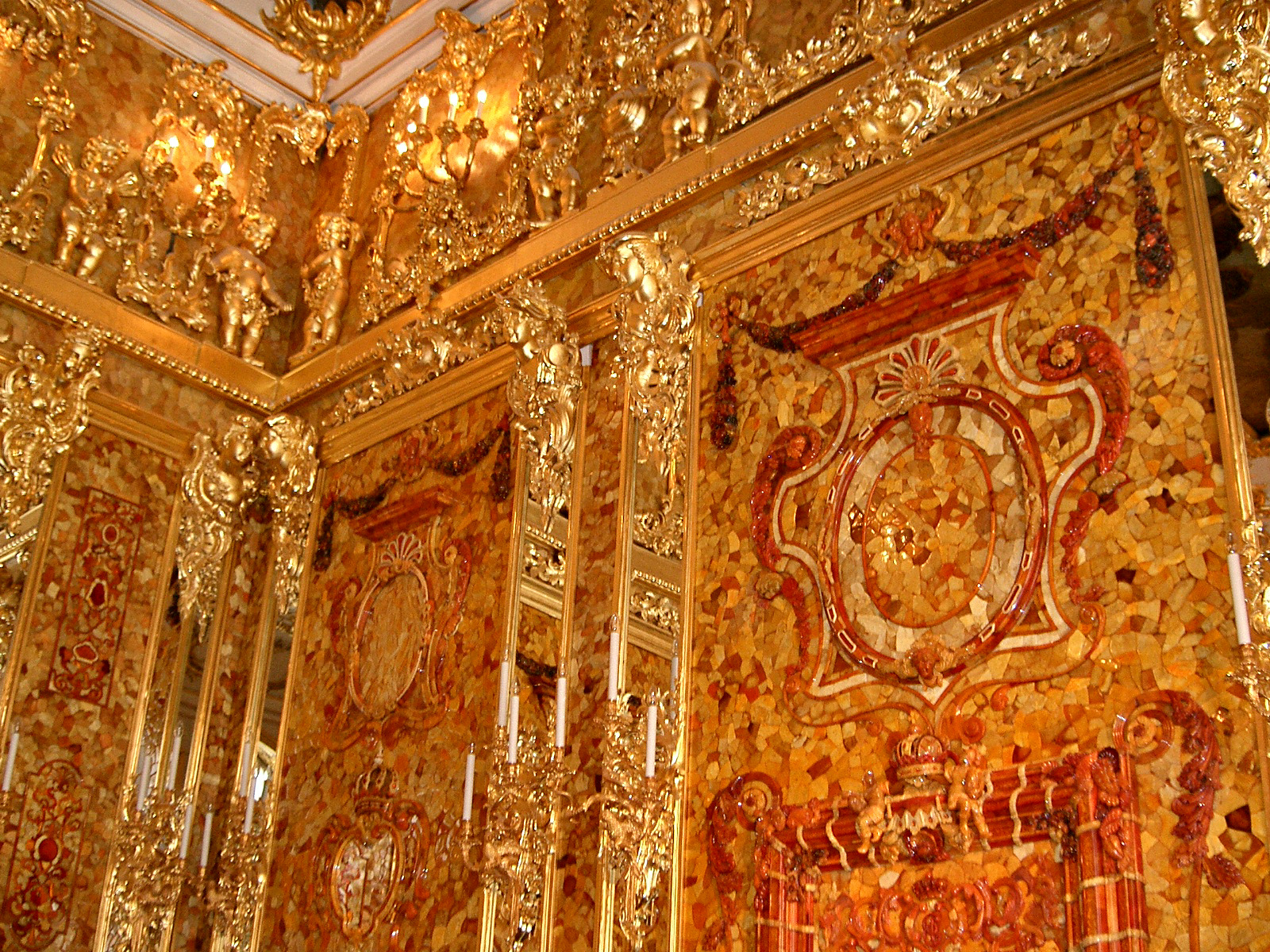
Corner section of the reconstructed Amber Room

The Amber Room had begun in 1701 with the purpose of being installed at Charlottenburg Palace, the residence of Frederick, the first King in Prussia, at the urging of his second wife, Sophia Charlotte. The concept and design of the room was drafted by Andreas Schlüter. It was fabricated by Gottfried Wolfram, master craftsman to the Danish court of King Frederick IV of Denmark, with help from the amber masters Ernst Schacht and Gottfried Turau from Danzig, now Gdańsk in Poland.

Although originally intended for installation at Charlottenburg Palace, the complete panels were eventually installed at Berlin City Palace. The Amber Room did not, however, remain at Berlin City Palace for long. Peter the Great of Russia admired it during a visit, and in 1716, King Frederick I's son Frederick William I presented the room to Peter as a gift, which forged a Russo-Prussian alliance against Sweden.

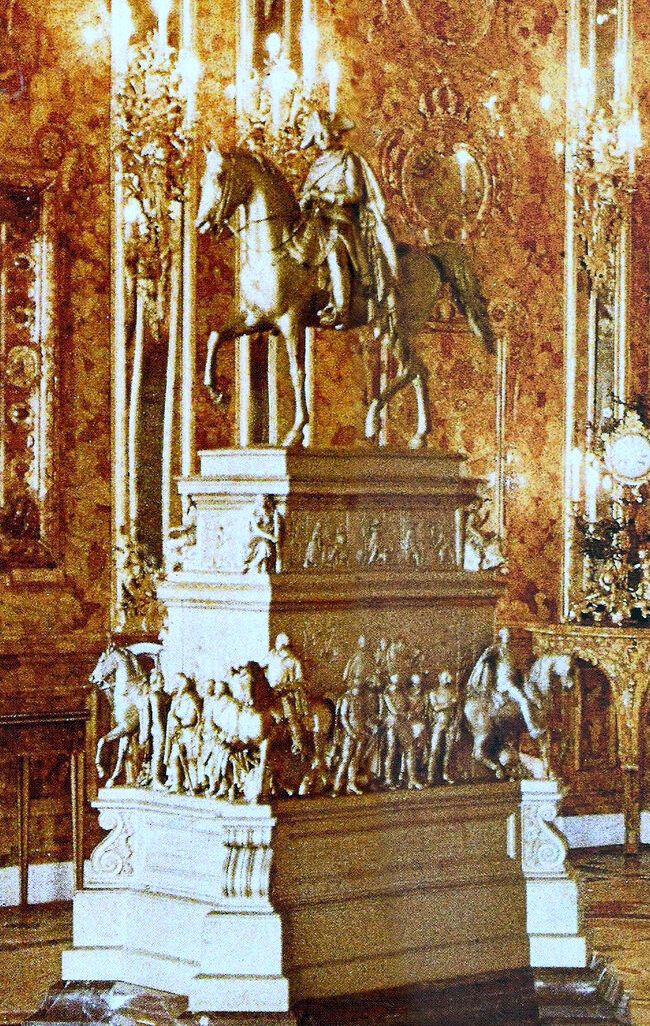
Equestrian statue of Frederick the Great in the Amber Chamber, Autochrome Lumière in 1917

The original Berlin design of the Amber Room was reworked in Russia in a joint effort by German and Russian craftsmen. It was Peter's daughter Empress Elizabeth who decided the amber treasure should be installed at Catherine Palace, where the Russian imperial family typically spent their summers. After several other 18th-century renovations, the room covered more than 55 square metres (590 ft^{2}) and contained over 6 tonnes (13,000 lb) of amber. The room took over ten years to construct.

In order to fit the Amber Room into a roughly six times larger hall for the Catherine Palace, the Italian architect Bartolomeo Francesco Rastrelli, in the service of the Russian court, had to enlarge it with gold and mirror elements. King Frederick II of Prussia presented the empress with additional amber elements that had not been used in its earlier installation in the Berlin Palace. As a sign of gratitude and admiration for the Prussian king, a silver miniature of the Berlin equestrian statue of Frederick the Great was placed in the Amber Room in the 19th century.

=== Theft during World War II ===
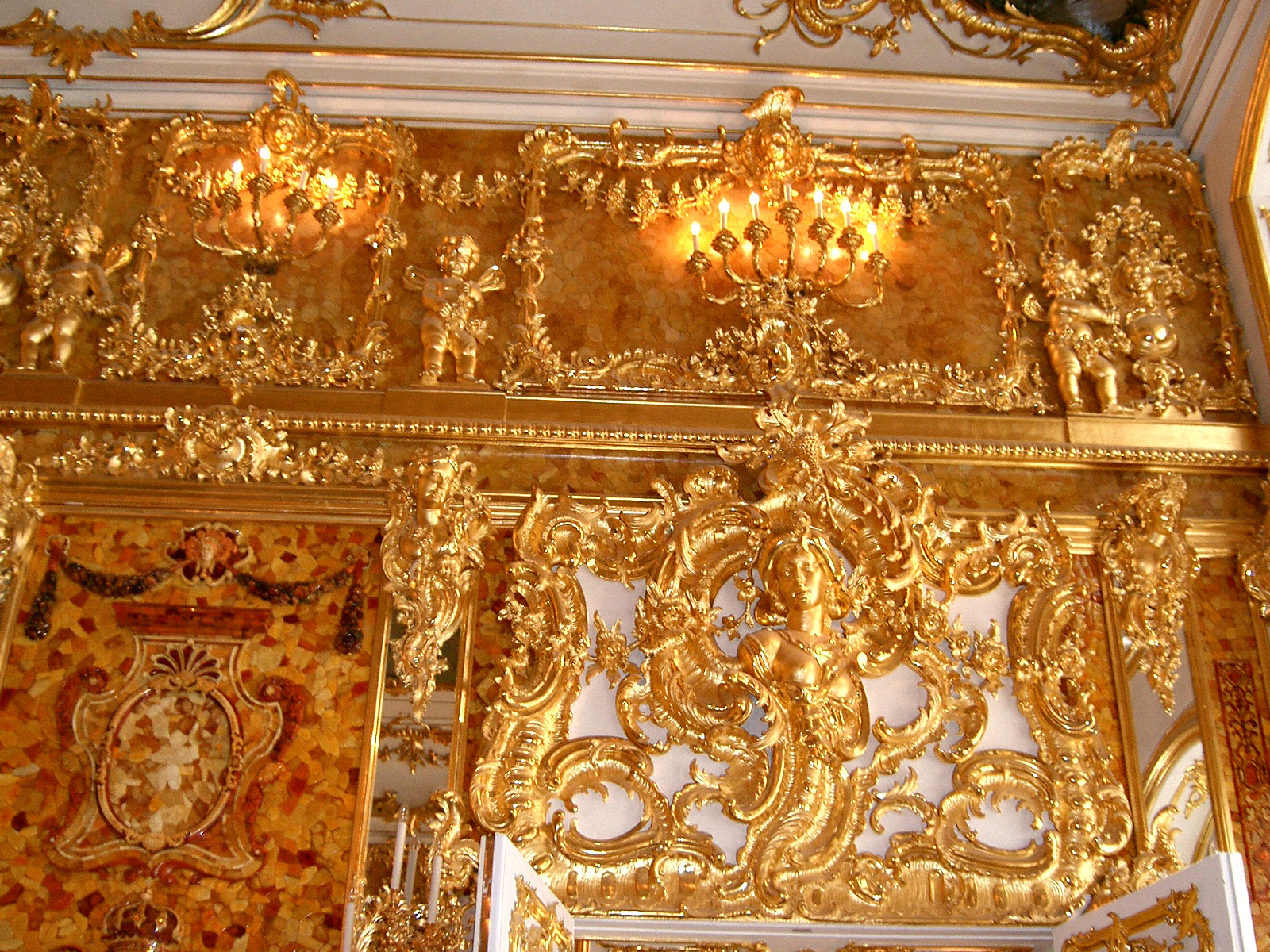
An angel statue featured on the wall of the Amber Room

Shortly after the beginning of the Nazi invasion of the Soviet Union in World War II, the curators responsible for removing the art treasures in Leningrad tried to disassemble and remove the Amber Room. However, over the years the amber had dried out and become brittle, making it impossible to move the room without the amber crumbling. The Amber Room was therefore hidden behind mundane wallpaper, in an attempt to keep German forces from seizing it, but the attempt to hide such a well-known piece of art failed.

German soldiers of Army Group North disassembled the Amber Room within 36 hours under the supervision of two experts. On 14 October 1941, the priceless room reached Königsberg in East Prussia, for storage and display in the town's castle.

=== Last days in Königsberg ===
On 21 and 24 January 1945, Hitler ordered the movement of looted possessions from Königsberg. This allowed Albert Speer, Reichsminister of Armaments, and his administration team to transport cultural goods of priority. However, before the Amber Room could be moved, Erich Koch, who was in charge of civil administration in Königsberg during the final months of the war, abandoned his post and fled the city, leaving General Otto Lasch in command.

In August 1944, Königsberg was heavily fire-bombed by the Royal Air Force. It suffered further extensive damage from the artillery of the advancing Red Army before the final occupation on 9 April 1945.

== Disappearance and mysteries ==
After the war, the Amber Room was never seen in public again, though reports have occasionally surfaced stating that pieces of the Amber Room survived the war. Several eyewitnesses claimed to have spotted the famous room being loaded on board the Wilhelm Gustloff, which left Gdynia (at the time Gotenhafen) on 30 January 1945, and was then promptly torpedoed and sunk by a Soviet submarine.

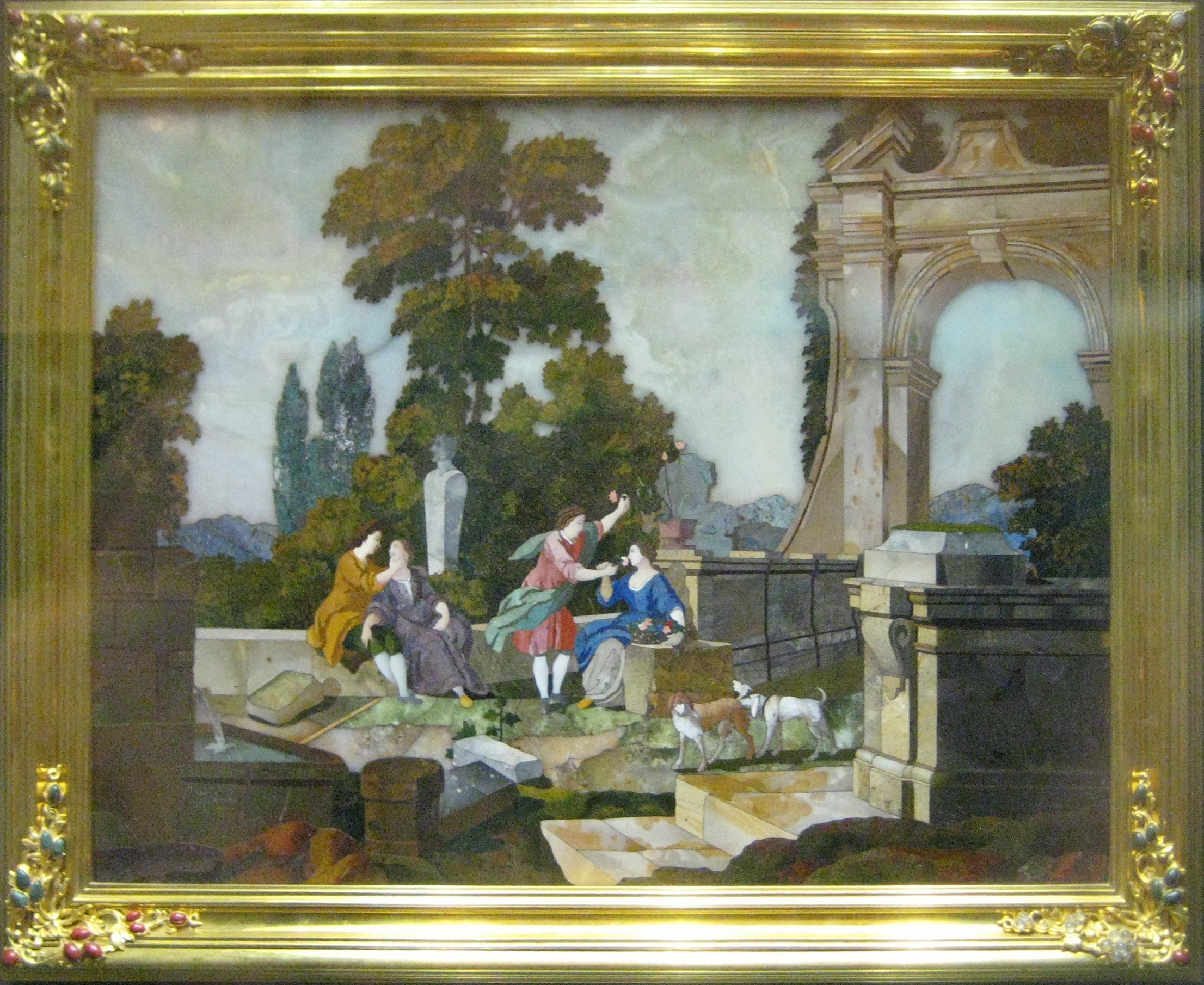
Feel and Touch mosaic (part of the cycle of mosaics donated to Elizabeth Petrovna by Empress Maria Theresa)

In 1997, an Italian stone mosaic "Feel and Touch" that was part of a set of four stones which had decorated the Amber Room was found in Germany, in the possession of the family of a soldier who claimed to have helped pack up the amber chamber. The mosaic came into the hands of the Russian authorities and was used in the reconstruction.

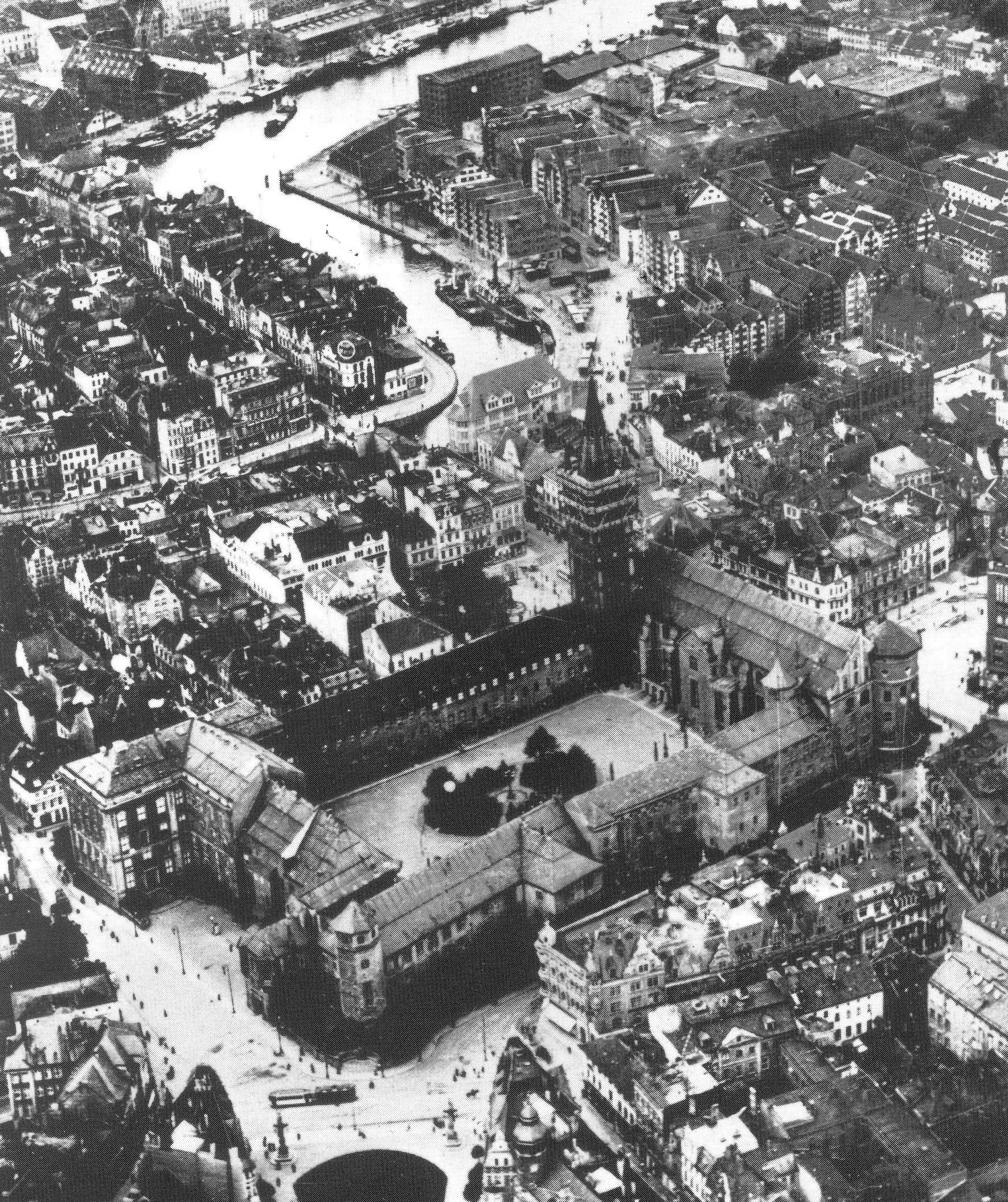
Königsberg Castle, 1925

In 1998, two separate teams, one German and one Lithuanian, announced they had located the Amber Room. The German team pointed to a silver mine while the Lithuanian team believed the amber treasure was buried in a lagoon; neither of the two locations turned out to hold the Amber Room.

In 2004, a lengthy investigation by British investigative journalists Catherine Scott-Clark and Adrian Levy concluded that the Amber Room was most likely destroyed when Königsberg Castle was damaged, first during the bombing of Königsberg by the Royal Air Force in 1944 and then by the Soviets' burning of the castle followed by shelling of the remaining walls. Official assessments, set out in documents from the Russian National Archives written by Alexander Brusov, head of the Soviet team charged with locating the Amber Room following the war, agreed with this theory. The official report stated: "Summarizing all the facts, we can say that the Amber Room was destroyed between 9 and 11 April 1945."

These dates correspond with the end of the Battle of Königsberg, which on 9 April ended with the surrender of the German garrison. A few years later, Brusov publicly voiced a contrary opinion; this is believed to have been done due to pressure from Soviet authorities, who did not want to be seen as responsible for the loss of the Amber Room.

Among other information retrieved from the archives was the revelation that the remaining Italian stone mosaics were found in the burned debris of the castle. Scott-Clark and Levy concluded in their report that the reason the Soviets conducted extensive searches for the Amber Room, even though their own experts had concluded that it was destroyed, was because they wanted to know if any of their own soldiers had been responsible for the destruction. Scott-Clark and Levy also assessed that others in the Soviet government found the theft of the Amber Room a useful Cold War propaganda tool. Russian government officials have since denied these conclusions. Adelaida Yolkina, senior researcher at the Pavlovsk Palace, reportedly stated: "It is impossible to see the Red Army being so careless that they let the Amber Room be destroyed".

After the report was made public, Leonid Arinshtein, who was a lieutenant in the Red Army in charge of a rifle platoon during the Battle of Königsberg, said: "I probably was one of the last people who saw the Amber Room". At the same time, he explained that the whole city was burning due to artillery bombardments, but also denied allegations that the Red Army burned the city on purpose, saying: "What soldiers would burn the city where they will have to stay?"

A variation of this theory by some present-day residents of Kaliningrad (formerly Königsberg), is that at least parts of the room were found in the Königsberg Castle cellars after World War II by the Red Army. The Amber Room was allegedly still in good condition; this was not admitted at the time so the blame could fall upon the Nazis. To preserve this story, access to the ruins of the castle, which was allowed after World War II, was suddenly restricted to all, including historical and archaeological surveys, but the room is said to be in a storehouse near Königsberg Castle.

Then in 1968, despite academic protests worldwide, Soviet general secretary Leonid Brezhnev ordered the destruction of Königsberg Castle, thus making any onsite research of the last known resting place of the Amber Room all but impossible. Later the search for the Amber Room continued in different locations, including near Wuppertal, Germany.

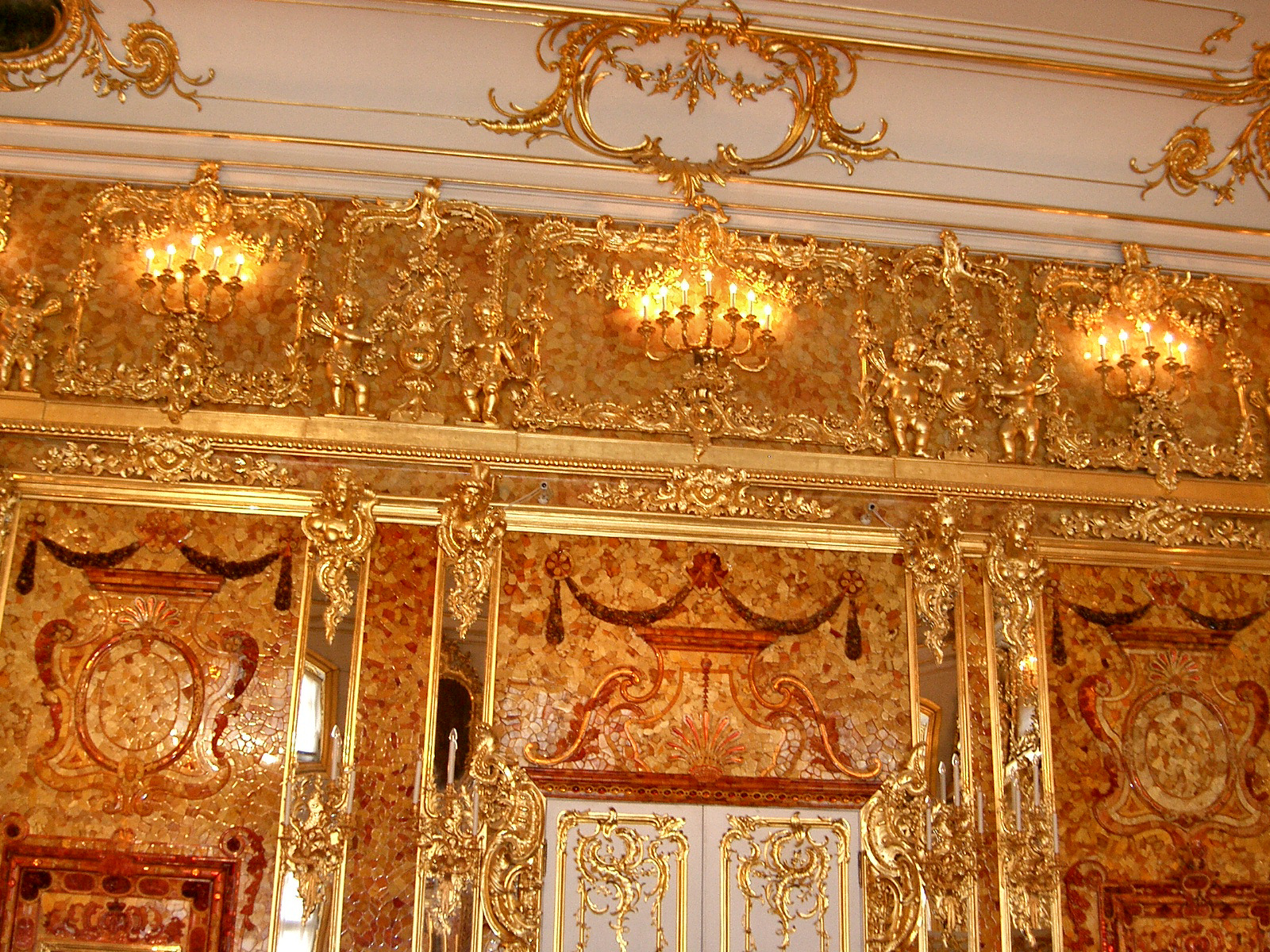
Immense sums were spent on both the original and reconstructed Amber Room.

Another hypothesis involves a bunker in Mamerki in northeastern Poland, or that Stalin ordered the Amber Room replaced with a replica prior to its looting, hiding the original. The main problem with finding the Amber Room is that the Nazi regime hid many items in many difficult-to-reach places, usually without documentation, leaving a wide search area. The Germans also moved items to destinations far from Europe in some cases. The search for the Amber Room has also been halted by authorities. In the case of Frýdlant castle it was halted because of the historic value of the castle.

In October 2020 Polish divers from the Baltictech group found the wreck of the SS Karlsruhe, a ship which took part in Operation Hannibal, a sea evacuation which allowed more than a million German troops and civilians from East Prussia to escape advancing Soviet forces. The ship was attacked off the coast of Poland by Soviet aircraft after it sailed from Königsberg in 1945. The wreck holds many crates with unknown contents. An online news website, Live Science, reported that some of the crates might contain parts of the Amber Room, but divers subsequently discovered that they contained military equipment and personal belongings.

== Reconstruction ==
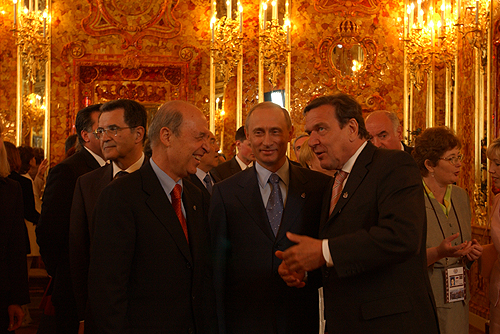
President of Russia Vladimir Putin with Italian prime minister Romano Prodi, Greek prime minister Konstantinos Simitis and German chancellor Gerhard Schröder in the Amber Room (2003)

In 1979, the Soviet government decided to construct a replica of the Amber Room at Tsarskoye Selo, a process that was to take 24 years and require 40 Russian and German experts in amber craftsmanship. Using original drawings and old black-and-white photographs, every attempt was made to duplicate the original Amber Room. This included the 350 shades of amber in the original panels and fixtures that adorned the room. A major problem was the lack of skilled workers, since amber carving was a nearly lost art form.

The financial difficulties that plagued the reconstruction project from the start were solved with the donation of US$3.5 million from the German company E.ON. By 2003, the work of the Russian craftsmen was mostly completed. The new room was dedicated by Russian president Vladimir Putin and German chancellor Gerhard Schröder at the 300th anniversary of the city of Saint Petersburg. In Kleinmachnow, near Berlin, there is a miniature Amber Room, fabricated after the original. The Berlin miniature collector Ulla Klingbeil had this copy made of original East Prussian amber.

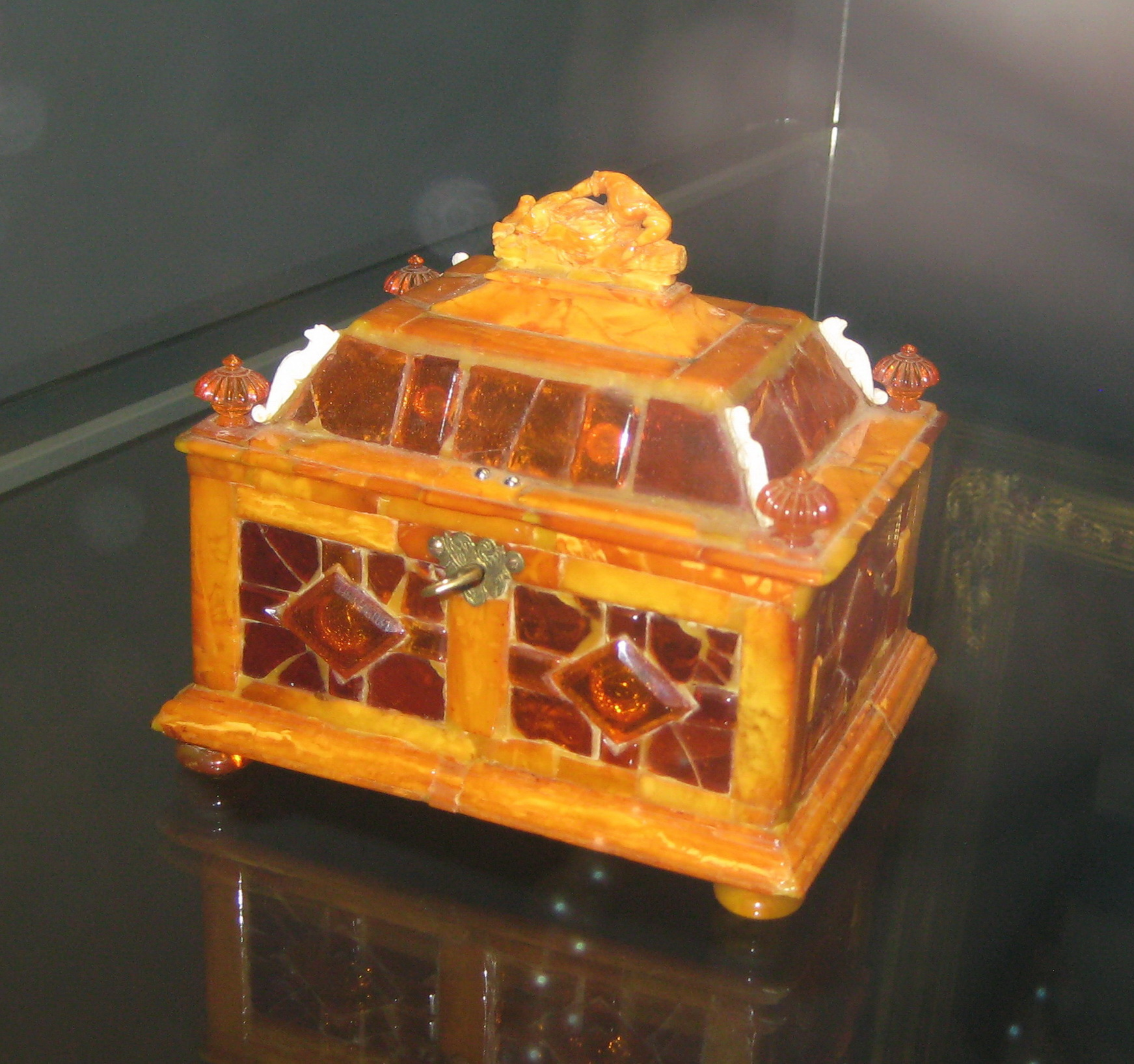
Amber case presented by Friedrich Wilhelm I to Peter the Great during his stay in Berlin in 1716.

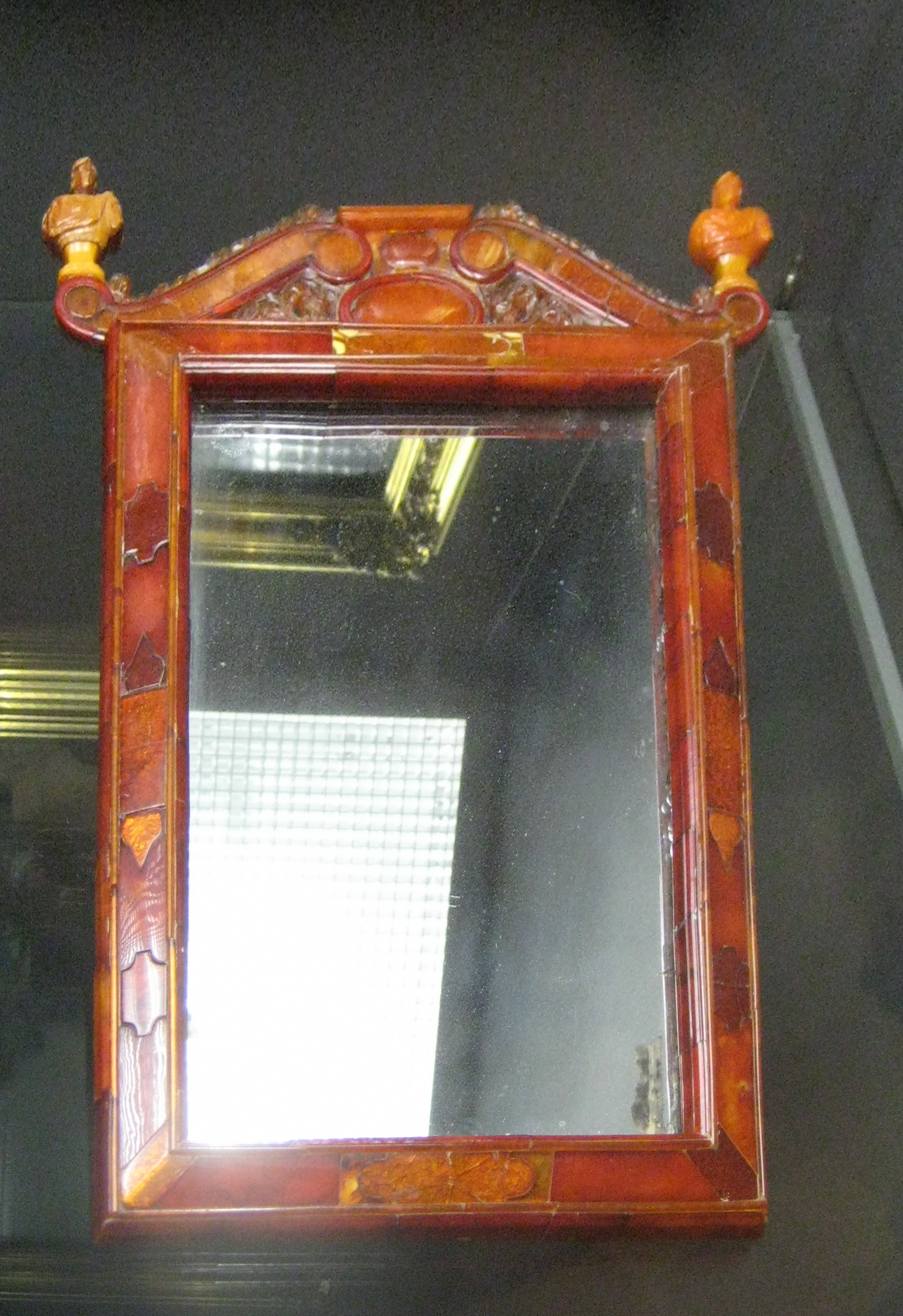
Mirror presented by Friedrich Wilhelm I to Peter the Great in 1716

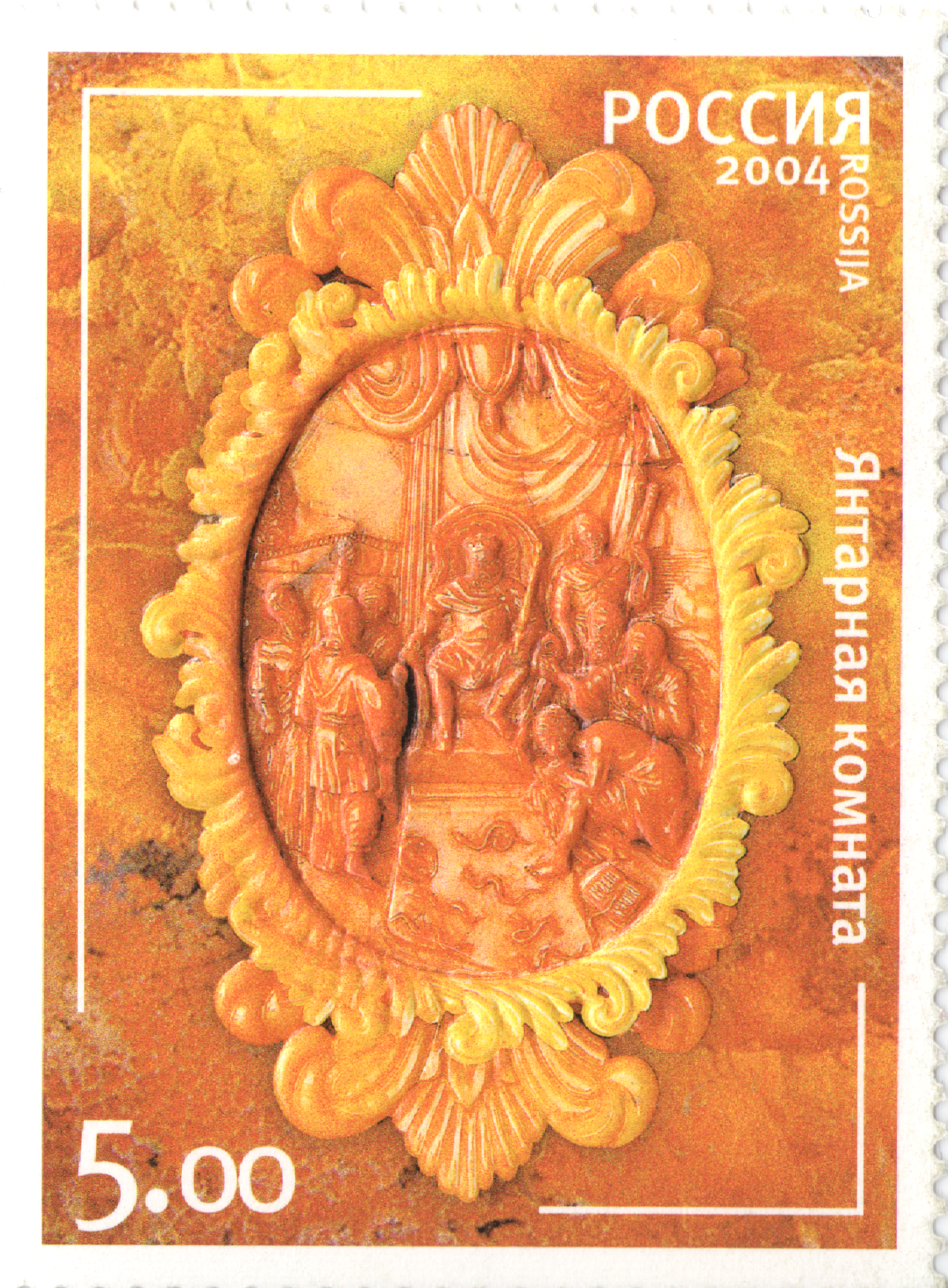
Amber room on a 2004 postage stamp

== See also ==
- Art in Nazi Germany
- Nazi gold train
- Siege of Leningrad
- Štěchovice treasure

== Sources ==
=== Printed ===
- Denny, Isabel (2007). The Fall of Hitler's Fortress City: the Battle for Königsberg, 1945. MBI Publishing. ISBN 978-1935149200.
- Khatri, Vikas (2012). World Famous Treasures Lost and Found. Pustak Mahal Publishing. ISBN 978-8122312744.
- Lucas, James (2000). Last Days of the Reich: The Collapse of Nazi Germany, May 1945. Cassell Publishing. ISBN 978-0304354481.
- Scott-Clark, Catherine; Levy, Adrian (2004). The Amber Room: The Untold Story of the Greatest Hoax of the Twentieth Century. Atlantic Books. ISBN 1-84354-340-0.
- Wermusch, Günter (1991). Die Bernsteinzimmer Saga: Spuren, Irrwege, Rätsel (in German). Yale University. ISBN 978-3861530190.

=== Online ===
- "A Brief History of the Amber Room". Smithsonian Institution. 2014.
- "Amber Room Hunt Makes Lake the Tsar Attraction". Scotland on Sunday. 2006.
- "Amber Room Remnants Found? — Discoveries Delight Russian Art Experts". Seattle Times. 1997.
- "Catherine Palace". St. Petersburg. 2001.
- "Erich Koch, Regarded as One of Cruelest of Hitler's SS Men, Dies in Prison at 90". Los Angeles Times. 1986.
- "Greed, Glory and a Tsar's Lost Treasure". The Guardian. 2004.
- "Mystery of the Amber Room Resurfaces". ABC News. 2004.
- "Red Army, Not the Nazis, Destroyed Tsar's Amber Room". Telegraph. 2004.
- "Resurrecting Königsberg: Russian City Looks to German Roots". Der Spiegel. 2014.
- "Restoration of the Amber Chamber is Coming to an End". Pravda. 2007.
- "Russian Jeweller Recreates the Amber Room In His Workshop". Russia Beyond the Headlines. 2013.
- "Top 10 Famous Pieces of Art Stolen by the Nazis". Toptenz. 2014.
- "The Amber Room: History, Figures, Facts and Mysteries" (in Russian). RIA Novosti. 2010.
- "The Amber Room: Long Lost Treasure". AskMen. 2004.
- "The Amber Room". About. 2014. Archived from the original on 13 January 2017.
