= SS Karlsruhe (1905) =

German cargo ship

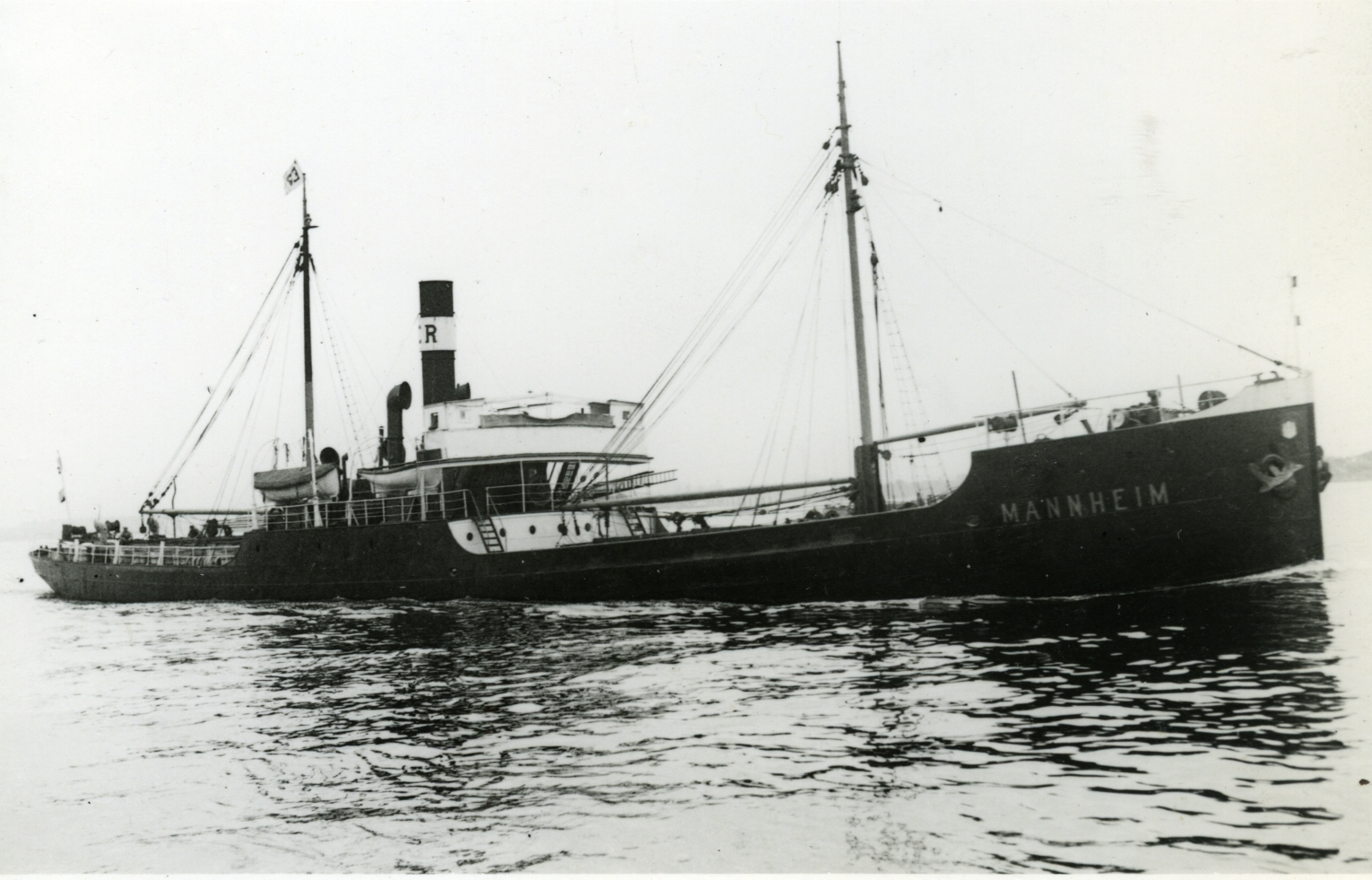
- SS Mannheim (sister ship of the SS Karlsruhe)

History
- Name: Karlsruhe
- Owner: Hamburg America Line; Ernst Russ Reederei
- Port of registry: Hamburg
- Route: Hamburg America Line's North Atlantic route
- Builder: Schichau Seebeckwerft
- Yard number: 228
- Launched: 1905
- Fate: Sunk 13 April 1945

General characteristics
- Tonnage: 897 GRT
- Length: 66.3 m (217.5 ft)
- Beam: 10.1 m (33.1 ft)
- Depth: 3.7 m (12.1 ft)
- Installed power: 2 x 3 cylinder triple expansion steam engines, dual shaft
- Propulsion: Twin screw
- Speed: 8 kn (15 km/h; 9 mph)

The SS Karlsruhe was a German cargo ship from 1905 of the Hamburg America Line, and later sold to the Ernst Russ Shipping Company. It was sunk on 13 April 1945 with great loss of life by Soviet aircraft during Operation Hannibal.

== History ==
The ship was built in 1905 at Schichau Seebeckwerft in Bremerhaven for the Hamburg America Line. In 1918 Thomas Kier, formerly captain of the SS Imperator, became captain of the Karlsruhe. In 1935 the ship was acquired by the Ernst Russ Shipping Company.

== Final voyage ==
On 11 April 1945, the Karlsruhe took 1,083 refugees on board in Pillau and left the port at around 20:00 for the Hel Peninsula, where the ship arrived on 12 April 1945 in the morning. There, a convoy was formed with the steamers SS Santander, SS Karlsruhe and three minesweepers, which departed at around 09:00 for Copenhagen.

The overloaded Karlsruhe was not able to maintain the required speed of the convoy of 9 knots, and could only run a good 7 knots. On 13 April 1945, she was attacked by Soviet planes north of Stolpmünde and hit with a torpedo. The ship broke in two and sank within three to four minutes. The minesweepers of the 25th minesweeping flotilla, M 294 (Kapitänleutnant Volberts) and M 341 (Oberleutnant zur See Henry Peter Rickmers), were able to save only 150 of the approximately 1083 refugees, with M 294 rescuing 63, and M 341 rescuing 87.

== Discovery of the wreck and speculations ==
The well-preserved wreck was found and inspected by Polish divers in July 2020. Speculation persists some crates inside may contain art/ornaments looted from the Catherine Palace's Amber Room in 1941, taken to Königsberg and lost in 1945. Divers subsequently discovered that the crates on the ship contained military equipment and personal belongings.

== Sources ==
- Wrecksite
- Eyewitness report of a survivor (in German)
- Wlb Stuttgart
- Reuters on the location of the ship
