= Nazi dental gold =

Gold extracted from the mouths of victims of the Holocaust

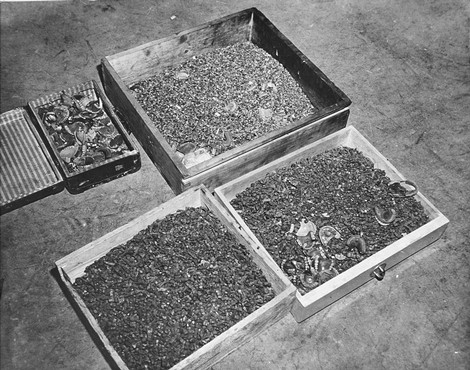
Boxes of gold dental caps and dentures from prisoners of the Buchenwald concentration camp, recovered by American troops after the liberation of the camp

The collection of gold dental fillings, dental caps and dentures extracted from the mouths of the victims of Aktion T4 and the Nazi concentration camps was a feature of the Holocaust. The practice originated with a 1940 order from Heinrich Himmler, and reinforced by a second order in 1942. The collection was done with the active and voluntary cooperation of German dentists. Dentists involved in the collection of gold included Martin Hellinger.

Collected gold was then melted down into gold bars. The disposition of the gold was an issue following the war's end.

== Trials and prosecution ==
With studies of the complicity of the medical profession in the crimes of the Third Reich on the rise, there is a question raised of the extent of justice brought down upon the doctors during the international trials after World War II. The trials led to 48 dentists standing trial. The archetypical accused dentist was male, lived in a traditional family, was a part of the National Socialist Workers' Party (NSDAP) and the Waffen-SS (Schutzstaffel), and belonged to the Kriegsjugendgeneration.

=== Results of trials ===
47 male dentists and one female dentist were identified in one of the studies. 27 of the accused dentists were born between 1900–1910, meaning they belonged to the Kriegsjugendgeneration. Fifteen were born before 1900, and six were born after 1910. Kriegsjugendgeneration members were influenced by National Socialism at a young age, and this generation was the most important generation for the National Socialists for recruitment.

Many of these dentists served in concentration camps and their administrative offices. Of the 48 identified dentists, 22 were stationed in at least one concentration camp. Of these 22, 19 were members of the Waffen-SS.

Overview of Dentists' Jurisdictions and Sentences
Surname	First Name	Jurisdiction	Sentence
Ahlers	Hans	Supreme Court British Zone	Custodial Sentence 5 Months
Alfken	Gottlob Adolph Hermann	French Court	Forced Labor 5 Years
aus dem Bruch	Kurt Otto	British Court	Acquittal
Belger	Eduard	German Court	Termination of the Proceedings
Bergeest	Willy August Heinrich	Supreme Court British Zone	Termination of the Proceedings
Brandt	(Rud)Olf	American Court	Custodial Sentence 3 Years
Bremmer	Walter Konrad Christian	German Court	Termination of the Proceedings
Denecke	Paul	Supreme Court British Zone	unknown
Deutschle	Karl	French Court	Custodial Sentence Length of pre-trial detention
Erckmann	Hermann	German Court	Custodial Sentence 6 Months
Frank	Willy	German Court	Custodial Sentence 7 Years
Geiler	Fritz	Soviet Military Court	Death Sentence
Graf	Georg	French Court	Custodial Sentence 4 Years
Hellinger	Martin	British Court	Custodial Sentence 15 Years
Hellmuth	Karl	American Court	Custodial Sentence 3 Years
Hellmuth	Otto	American Court	Death Sentence
Henkel	Wilhelm	American Court	Death Sentence
Hoehne	Rudolf Max	American Court	Custodial Sentence 5 Years
Hoffmann	Werner	French Court	Acquittal
Höhler	Walter	American Court	Death Sentence
Johst	Elisabeth	Soviet Military Court	Death Sentence
Judmann	Franz	Vienna People's Court	Termination of the Proceedings
Körber	Paul	French Court	Custodial Sentence 10 Years
Korweslühr	Herbert	Supreme Court British Zone	Custodial Sentence 9 Months
Kunz	Helmut	Soviet Military Court German Court	Forced Labour 25 Years Termination of the Proceedings
Lorenz	Fritz	Soviet Military Court	Death Sentence
Müller	Heinrich Theodor	German Court	Custodial Sentence 1 Year
Oetken	Friedrich	Supreme Court British Zone	Custodial Sentence 3 Months
Pook	Hermann	American Court	Custodial Sentence 10 Years
Poupet	Ferdinand Benjamin	French Court	Death Sentence
Precht	Elimar	French Court	Death Sentence
Reichmann	Frantz	French Court	Forced Labor 15 Years
Rohde	Werner	British Courts	Death Sentence
Rost	Willy	French Court	Death Sentence
Schäfer	Kurt	French Court	Death Sentence
Schatz	WIlli	German Court	Acquittal
Schönig	Erich	British Court	Custodial Sentence 5 Years
Schulte	Josef	Supreme Court British Zone	Fine 500 DM
Simon	Josef	Polish Court	Custodial Sentence 14 Months
Sonntag	Walter	British Court	Death Sentence
Teuber	Karl-Heinz	Polish Court	Custodial Sentence 4 Years
Vogelsang	Karl	German Court	Custodial Sentence 5 Months
Weck	Franz Christian	German Court	Custodial Sentence 5,5 Years
Weinmann	Ernst	Military Court Belgrade	Death Sentence
Wenzel	Hermann	French Court	Death Sentence
Werling	Heinrich	German Court	Acquittal
Zeiner	Karl Friedrich Jakob	Polish Court	Custodial Sentence 6 Years
Zerbes	Otmar Martin	American Court	Custodial Sentence 18 Months

== See also ==
- Nazi gold
