= Nazi gold train =

Urban legend

Nazi Gold Train
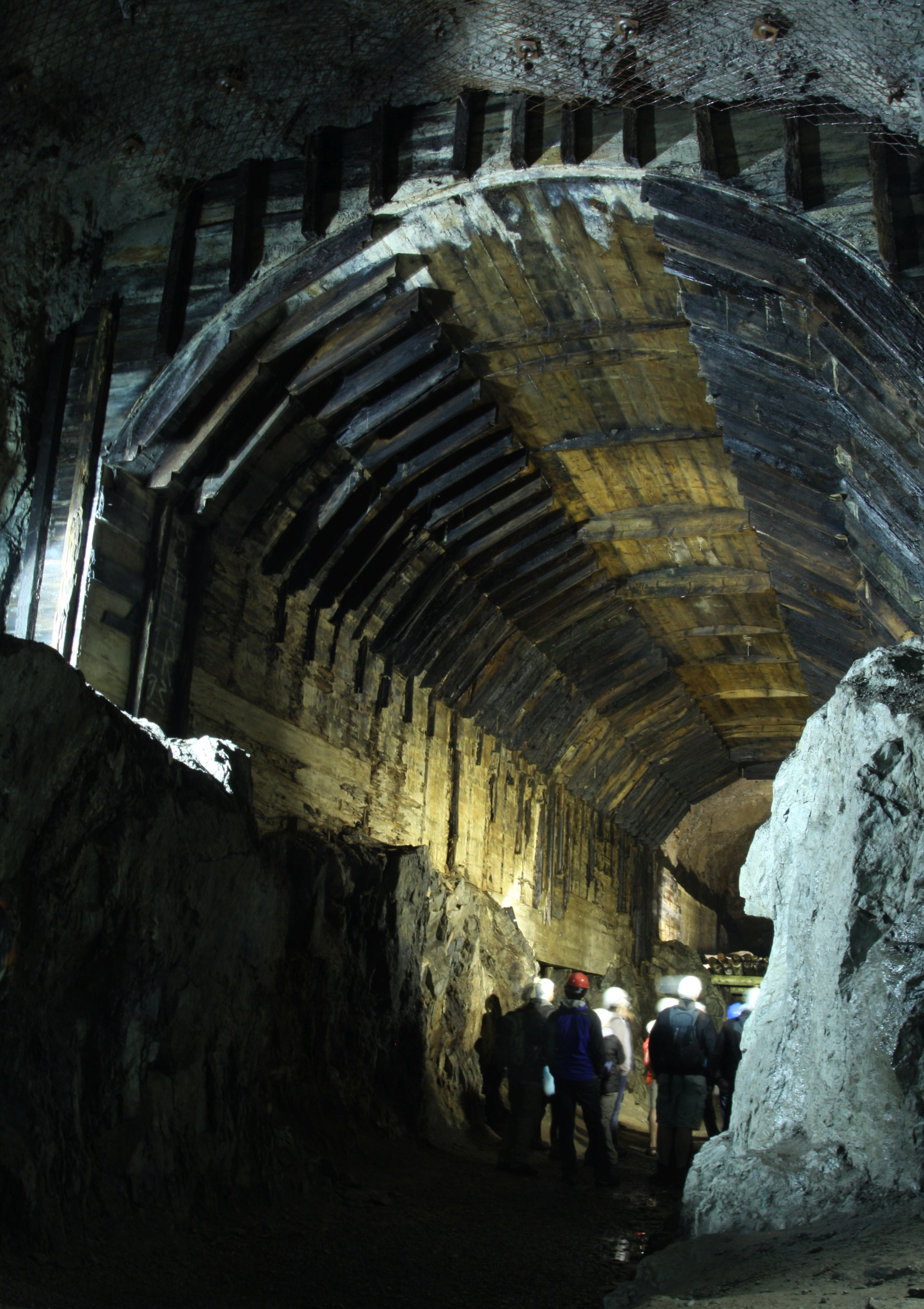
- A partially completed tunnel in Project Riese c. 2014
- Location: Wałbrzych, Central Sudetes, southwest Poland; 50°49′20″N 16°18′24″E
- Planned by: Germany
- Objective: conceal an armored train loaded with valuables and treasure from the Allies
- Date: 1945 – present
- Outcome: unresolved; historians consider the story to be false

The Nazi gold train or Wałbrzych gold train is an urban legend about a train laden with gold and treasure that was hidden by the Nazis in southwest Poland during the last days of World War II. The apocryphal tale claims the train full of valuables, including artwork, was concealed in a sealed-up rail tunnel or mine in the Central Sudetes by retreating Nazis. Despite numerous searches since 1945, including by the Polish Army during the Cold War, no evidence of the train, its tracks or treasure have ever been found. Historians believe the train never existed. However, some people still believe it exists.

Between 2015 and 2018, the train received renewed global media interest when two Polish men claimed to have discovered it using ground-penetrating radar. The search culminated in a dig involving the Polish military, state officials, and privately funded individuals. However, excavations were halted when the detected anomaly was found to be natural geology. Interest in the train led a group of enthusiasts to construct a full-size replica of a Nazi armored train with the hope of it becoming a tourist attraction.

== Background ==
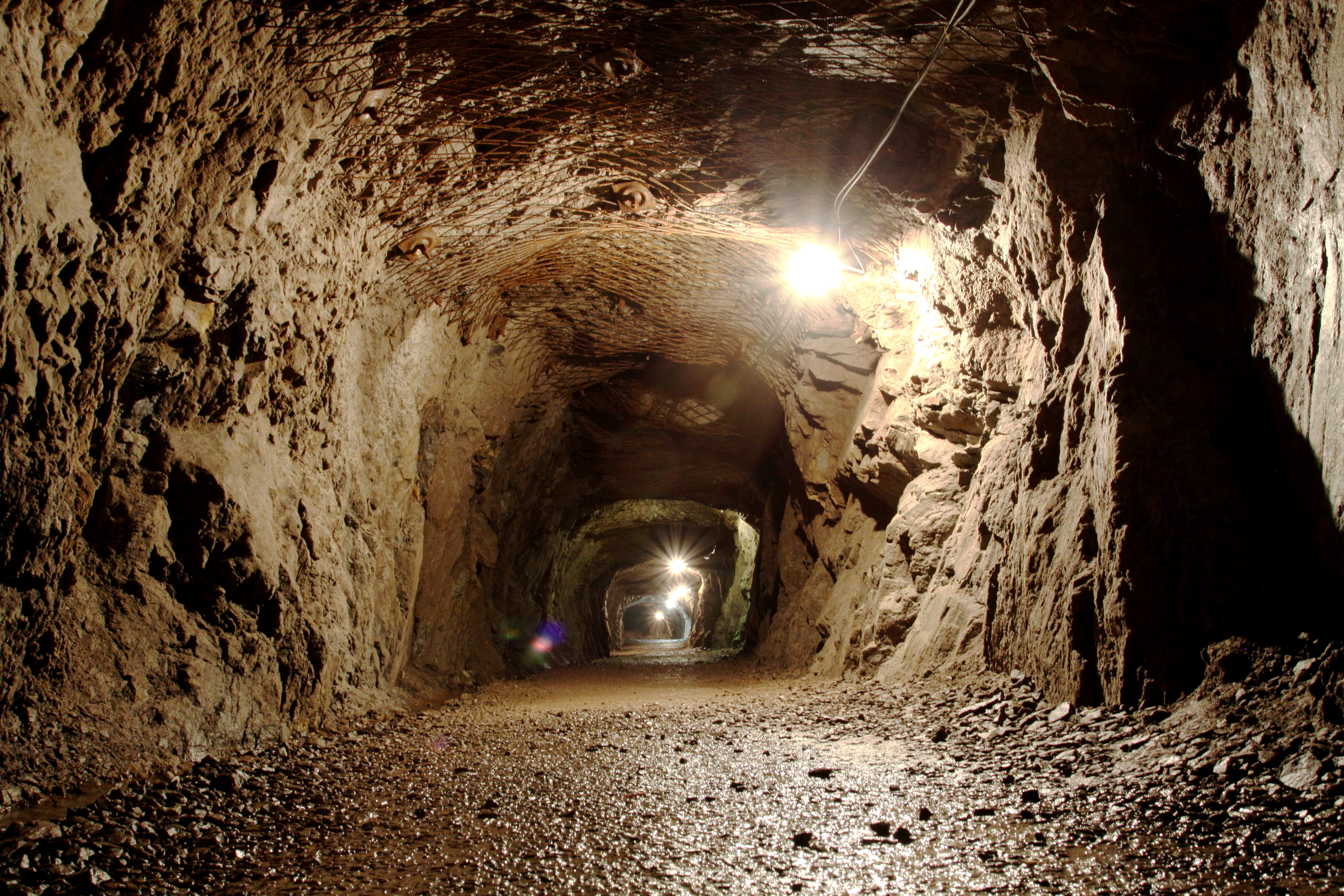
One of the unfinished tunnels of Project Riese in the Owl Mountains, Lower Silesia

According to the apocryphal story, in the last months of World War II, a Nazi armoured train laden with gold and other treasures left Breslau (now Wrocław), arrived at the station Freiburg in Schlesien (Świebodzice), but did not reach the next station in Waldenburg in Schlesien (Wałbrzych). The train is suspected to have entered an abandoned coal mine or tunnel system under Książ Castle, which is part of the unfinished, top secret Nazi construction project Project Riese in the Owl Mountains. On board the train was purported more than 300 t (330 tons) of gold, jewels, weapons, and artistic masterpieces.

According to historians, it has never been proven that the train ever existed.

== Search ==
=== Polish People's Republic ===
During the Polish People's Republic (1947–1989), the Polish Armed Forces carried out numerous searches for the train and found nothing.

=== Zone 65 ===
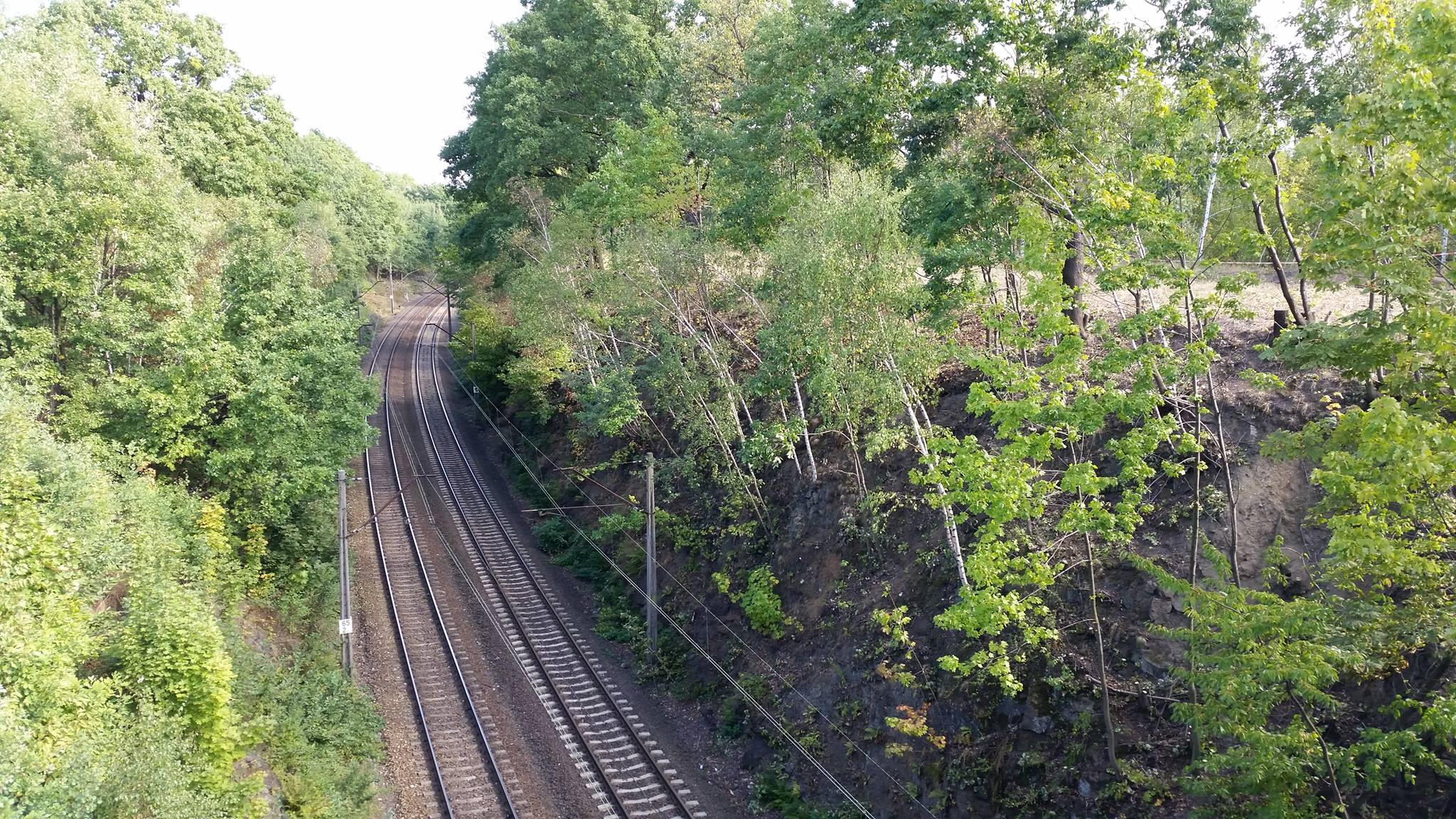
Supposed location of the missing Nazi gold train near Wałbrzych

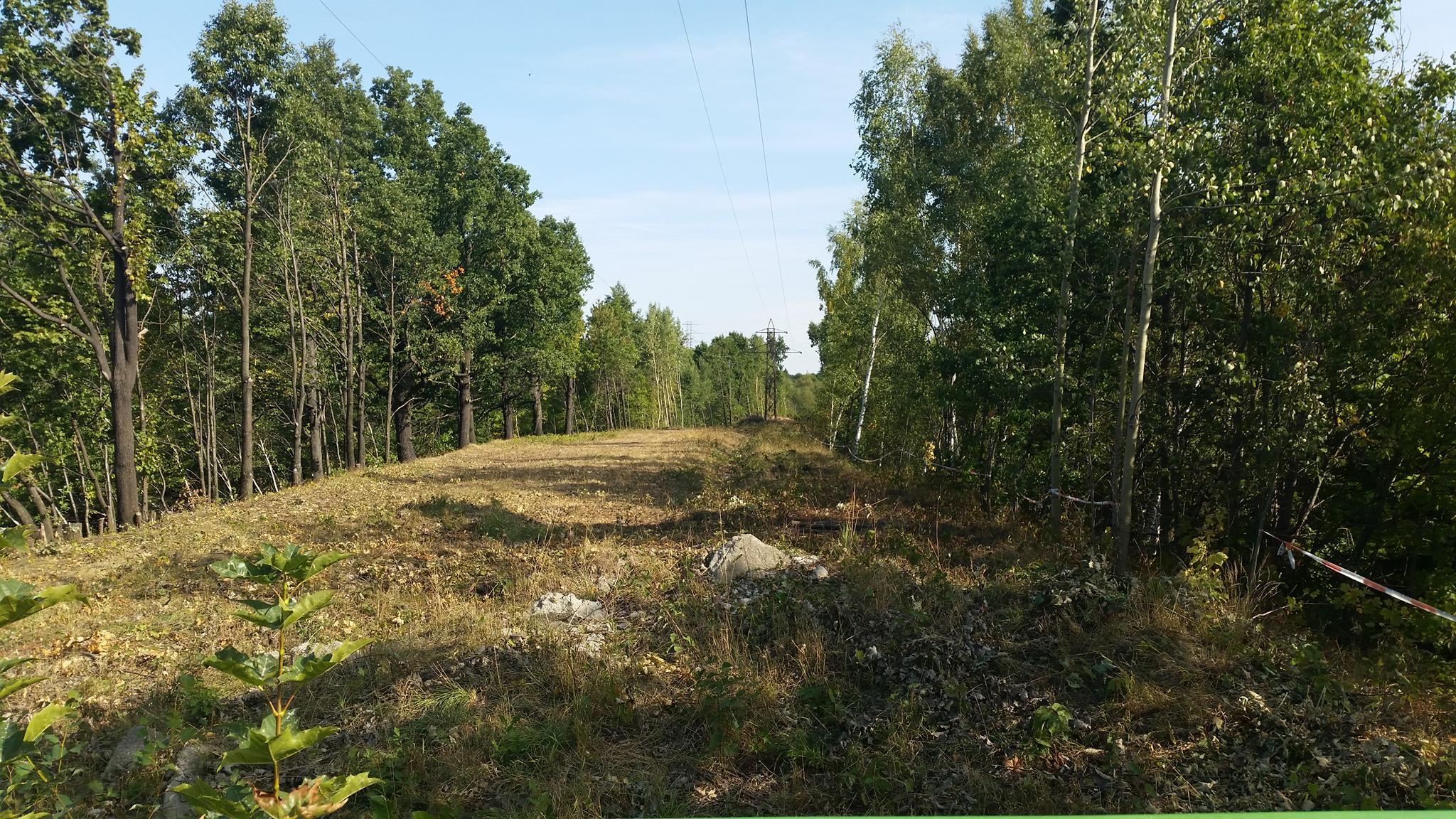
Railway embankment at "Zone 65", near the crossing of Uczniowska Street, Wałbrzych, where it was claimed the Gold Train was hidden

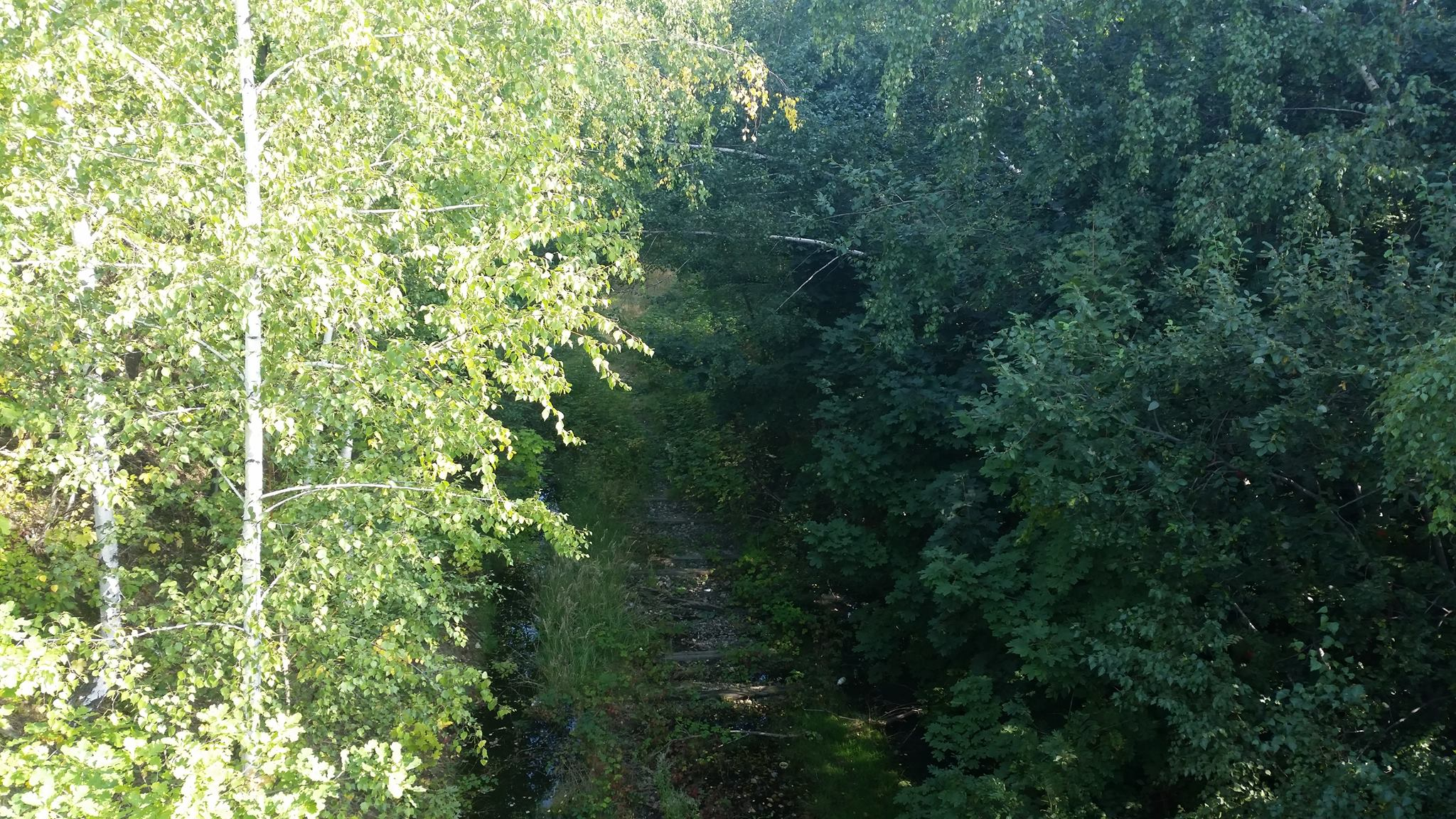
Remains of rail track near "Zone 65"

In late August 2015, news stories began circulating about two unidentified men who had obtained a deathbed confession about a buried gold train. The two were later identified as Piotr Koper of Poland and Andreas Richter of Germany, co-owners of the mine exploration company XYZ S.C. Using lawyers as an intermediary, the two men opened secret negotiations with the Polish government for a "finders' fee" of 10% of the value of the train in return for information leading to its location. They would reveal the exact location once the documents were signed.

Koper and Richter would later claim information about their discovery was leaked by the government, resulting in a worldwide media circus.

On 28 August, Polish Deputy Culture Minister Piotr Żuchowski announced that ground-penetrating radar images taken by Koper and Richter confirmed with 99% probability that a train of 100 metres in length had been found. However, on August 31, Tomasz Smolarz, Voivode (governor) of the Lower Silesian Voivodeship, told reporters that "There is no more proof for this alleged discovery than for other claims made over the years," saying, "It's impossible to claim that such a find actually exists at the location indicated based on the documents that have been submitted."

On 4 September, Koper and Richter went public for the first time, breaking their previous anonymity. They announced that the precise location of the train had been given to Polish authorities. They also released images they had taken with a KS-700 Ground Penetrating Radar system that appeared to show a 50-metre-deep man-made shaft with something in it. Koper and Richter believed the train was buried next to a 4-kilometre (2.5-mile) stretch of track on Polish State Railways' Wrocław–Wałbrzych line at kilometre 65.

Polish authorities sectioned off woodland in the area of kilometer 65, as well as deploying police and other guards in order to prevent access to the numerous treasure hunters who had arrived armed with detection equipment. In late September, the Polish military, acting at the request of the regional governor, began to clear the surface of trees and search for booby traps and mines. In October the military declared the area safe.

In mid-November, two different teams were cleared by city authorities in Wałbrzych to make a non-invasive assessment of the site. The first team was Koper and Richter. The second team consisted of mining specialists from the AGH University of Science and Technology in Kraków, headed by Janusz Madej. On 15 December, Madej's team announced that a survey had found no evidence of a train, though possible evidence of a collapsed tunnel. Koper and Richter stood by their claim of a train to which Madej responded: "It's human to make a mistake, but it's foolish to stand by it."

In May 2016, despite Madej's expert opinion that no train existed, Koper and Richter secured permission to begin digging at the site from the owners of the property, Polish State Railways. The excavation commenced on 15 August 2016 with a team of 64 people, including engineers, geologists, chemists, archaeologists and a specialist in military demolitions. The excavation reportedly cost 116,000 euros or $131,000 and was financed by private sponsors, and with the help of volunteers.

The dig was halted after seven days when no tracks, tunnel or train were found. The radar images thought to have been the train were revealed to be natural ice formations. An official from the town admitted tourism was up 44% for the year and said "the publicity the town has gotten in the global media is worth roughly around $200 million. Our annual budget for promotion is $380,000, so think about that. Whether the explorers find anything or not, that the gold train has already arrived." The town mayor was considering naming a roundabout after Koper and Richter.

At the beginning of December 2016, Koper and Richter declared their intention to create a foundation for the purpose of raising money to drill down to 20 meters in 2017. During the third search in June 2017, with the assistance of a geophysical company from Warsaw, the excavation team encountered seven cavities, which were suspected to be a railway tunnel. The find made deep drilling necessary, which, according to the contractors, would cost at least 100,000 zlotys (about 23,000 euros) for the permits and the actual excavation. The dig was scheduled for the spring or summer of 2018, when sponsors would be found.

In August 2018, Richter left the excavation team. Koper announced he would continue the search. While he never found Nazi gold, in January 2019, Koper discovered a series of large and "priceless" 16th-century wall paintings hidden behind a plaster wall while doing renovation work in an old palace in the village of Struga near Wrocław.

=== Gold Train 2025 ===
In July 2025, an anonymous group calling itself "Gold Train 2025", unrelated to the previous group at "Zone 65", claimed there is a gold train located at an undisclosed location in the Świdnica Forest District that surrounds Wałbrzych. Specifically three boxcars buried in an old train tunnel. They secured limited permission to search the surface with metal detectors and to dig up to 50 centimetres (20 inches) deep with hand shovels.

== See also ==
- Amber Room
- Confederate gold
- Hungarian Gold Train
- Nazi gold
- Oak Island Money Pit
