= Nazi gold =

Gold possessed by the Nazis during WWII

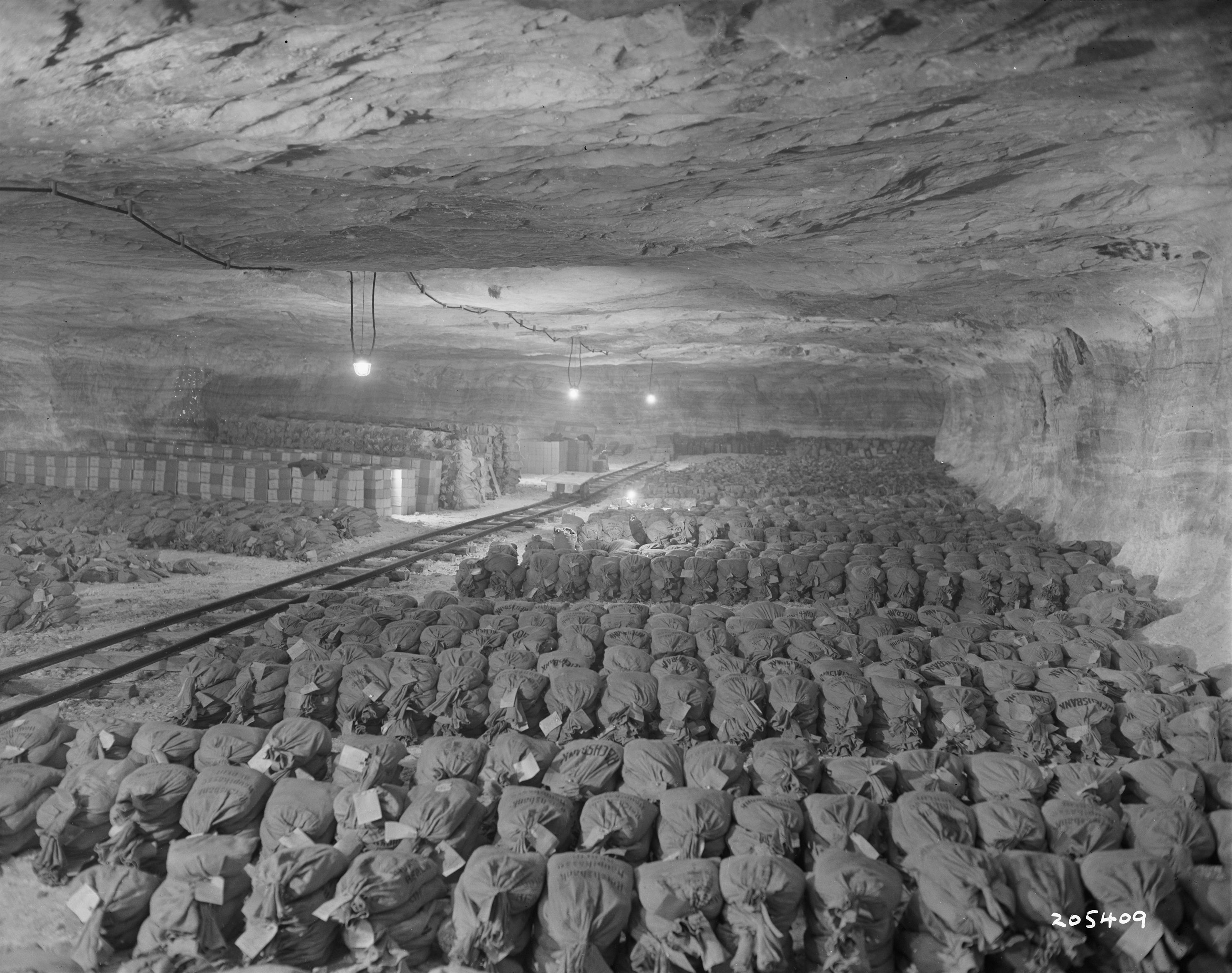
Nazi gold stored in Merkers Salt Mine

Much of the focus of the discussion about Nazi gold (German: Raubgold, "stolen gold") concerns how much of it Nazi Germany transferred to overseas banks during World War II. The Nazis looted the assets of their victims (including those in concentration camps) to accumulate wealth. In 1998, a Swiss commission estimated that the Swiss National Bank had received $440 million (equivalent to $8.5 billion in 2024) of Nazi gold, over half of which is believed to have been looted.

Some of the accumulated wealth was used to finance the war and potentially the escapes of Nazi fugitives to South America, but the total wealth or method of its spending remains subject to investigation. The fate of the gold has been the subject of several books, conspiracy theories, and a failed civil lawsuit brought in January 2000 against the Vatican Bank and the Franciscan Order.

== Acquisition ==
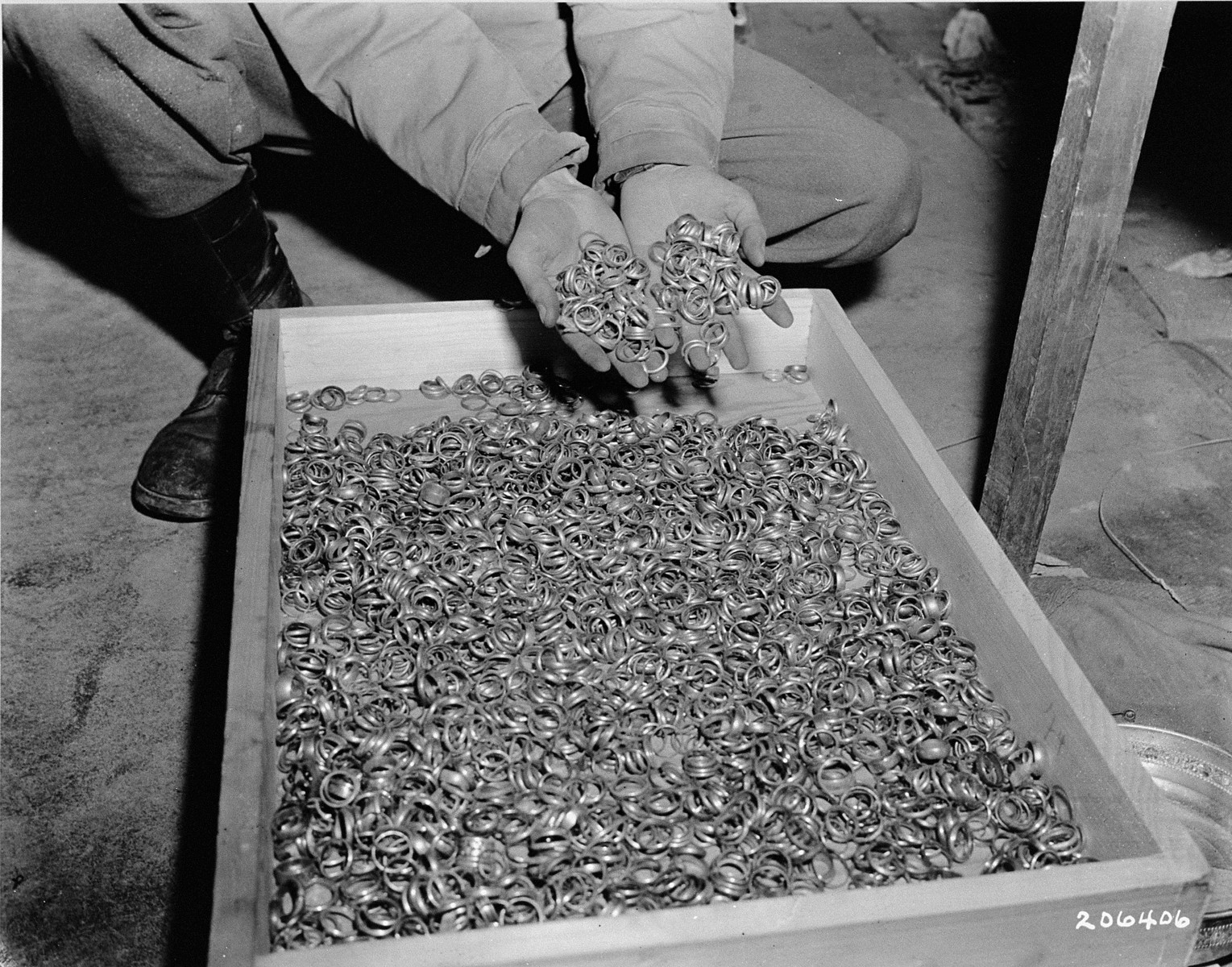
Gold rings of Buchenwald victims

The draining of Germany's gold and foreign exchange reserves inhibited the acquisition of materiel, and the Nazi economy, focused on militarization, could not afford to deplete the means to procure foreign machinery and parts. Nonetheless, towards the end of the 1930s, Germany's foreign reserves were unsustainably low. By 1939, Germany had defaulted on its foreign loans, and most of its trade relied upon command economy barter.

This tendency towards autarkic conservation of foreign reserves concealed a trend of expanding official reserves, which occurred through looting assets from annexed Austria, occupied Czechoslovakia, and Nazi-governed Danzig. It is believed that these three sources boosted German official gold reserves by US$71 million ($1.3 billion in 2020 currency) between 1937 and 1939. To mask the acquisition, the Reichsbank understated its official reserves in 1939 by $40m relative to the Bank of England's estimates. As Minister of Economics, Walther Funk accelerated the pace of rearmament and, as Reichsbank president, deposited the loot from Holocaust victims under the fictitious name Max Heiliger, in an arrangement with Schutzstaffel (SS) leader Heinrich Himmler.

At some point, German-Argentine millionaire Ludwig Freude, who oversaw Buenos Aires's German Overseas Bank (a subsidiary of Deutsche Bank), established contacts with Swiss banks. An early 1940s investigation ordered by anti-Nazi president Roberto Marcelino Ortiz identified 12,000 Nazi sympathizers in Argentina who contributed some US$40.5 million (2025 currency) to a single account at Schweizerische Kreditanstalt (later acquired by Credit Suisse). Government documents indicate financial ties amid the German Overseas Bank, the German-South American Bank (a subsidiary of Dresdner Bank), Freude, and others linked to numerous Argentine companies blacklisted by the U.S. In 1943, pro-fascist forces destroyed all known copies of the list, but one later resurfaced.

During the war, Germany expropriated some $550m in gold from foreign governments, including $223m from Belgium and $193m from the Netherlands—not including thefts of private citizens and companies, producing an uncertain total value of stolen assets. According to a late-1990s study for the U.S. Department of State led by American diplomat and attorney Stuart E. Eizenstat, gold looted from occupied countries and stolen from individuals was transferred to the Swiss National Bank (SNB) to finance the Nazi war effort. Some gold was taken from Holocaust victims, though Eizenstat points out there is no evidence the SNB knew of this, as the gold had been molded into bars. A Swiss commission headed by historian and economist Jean-François Bergier estimated that the SNB received $440m ($8b 2020) in gold from Nazi sources, of which $316m ($5.8b in 2020) is estimated to have been looted. Further, the Bergier commission found that the SNB's governing board knew at an early point that the gold was being looted from other countries. The U.S. study further found that Germany transferred over $300m (2.6b 1998)—about $240m of which was looted—to neutral countries Portugal, Spain, Sweden, and Turkey (all of which aided Germany through non-military exchanges), mostly using the SNB.

In 1984, a copy of the list of 12,000 Argentine Nazis was found. In 2020, it was shared with the Simon Wiesenthal Center (SWC), which had previously noted a lack of disclosures about Nazi gold deposits into the Central Bank of Argentina, theorized that funds derived from Nazi plunder was sent to the Nazi collaborators for deposit in the Swiss account for Germany to withdraw as exchangeable currency. The SWC has pushed Credit Suisse's owner, UBS, to cooperate with a new investigation of alleged undisclosed funds from Holocaust plunder, potentially linked to financing the escape routes of Nazi fugitives. A final report for the U.S. Senate by former U.S. prosecutor Neil Barofsky is expected in early 2026.

== Portugal ==
During the war, Portugal, with neutral status, was one of the centres of tungsten production and sold to both the Allied and Axis powers. Tungsten is a critical metal for armaments, especially for armour-piercing bullets and shells. The German armaments industry was nearly entirely dependent on the supplies from Portugal.

During the war, Portugal was the second largest recipient of Nazi gold, after Switzerland. Initially, the Nazi trade with Portugal was in hard currency, but in 1941, the Central Bank of Portugal established that much of this was counterfeit and Portuguese leader António de Oliveira Salazar demanded all further payments in gold.

In 2000, Jonathan Diaz, a French bus driver, found documents at the Canfranc International railway station that revealed 78 tonnes (86 short tons) of "Nazi Gold" had passed through the station.

It is estimated that nearly 91 tonnes (100 short tons) of Nazi gold were laundered through Swiss banks, with only 3.6 tonnes (4 short tons) being returned at the end of the war.

== Merkers Mine ==
Advancing north from Frankfurt, the U.S. Third Army cut into the future Soviet zone when it occupied the western tip of Thuringia. On 4 April 1945, the 90th Infantry Division took Merkers, a few kilometres inside the border in Thuringia. On the morning of the 6th, two military policemen, Private First Class (PFC) Clyde Harmon and PFC Anthony Kline, enforcing the customary orders against civilian circulation during an evening curfew, stopped two women on a road outside Merkers. Since both were French displaced persons, with one of them pregnant and attempting to find a doctor, the military policemen decided to bring them back to PFC Richard C. Mootz. Luckily for Mootz, he and the women had something in common: they could all speak German. While getting to know them better and escorting them back into the town, they passed the entrance to the Kaiseroda salt mine in Merkers.

The two women told Mootz that the mine contained gold stored by the Germans, along with other treasures. Once back in his unit, he attempted to tell three other officers, but they were not interested in listening. He called other military personnel; by noon, the story had passed on up to the chief of staff and the division's G-5 officer, Lt. Col. William A. Russell, who, in a few hours, had the news confirmed by other DPs and by a British sergeant who had been employed in the mine as a prisoner of war and had helped unload the gold. Russell also turned up an assistant director of the National Gallery in Berlin who admitted he was in Merkers to care for paintings stored in the mine.

The next day was Sunday. In the morning, while Colonel Bernard D. Bernstein, Deputy Chief, Financial Branch, G-5, Supreme Headquarters Allied Expeditionary Force (SHAEF), read about the find in the Stars and Stripes's Paris edition, 90th Infantry Division engineers blasted a hole in the vault wall to reveal on the other side a room 23 metres (75 feet) wide and 46 m (151 ft) deep. They found 3,682 bags and cartons of German currency, 80 bags of foreign currency, 8,307 gold bars, 55 boxes of gold bullion, 3,326 bags of gold coins, 63 bags of silver, one bag of platinum bars, eight bags of gold rings and 207 bags and containers of Nazi loot that included valuable artwork.

On Sunday afternoon, Bernstein, after verifying to the fullest the newspaper story with Lt. Col. R. Tupper Barrett, Chief, Financial Branch, G-5, 12th Army Group, flew to SHAEF Forward at Rheims where he spent the night, it being too late by then to fly into Germany. At noon on Monday, he arrived at General George S. Patton's Third Army Headquarters with instructions from General Dwight D. Eisenhower to check the contents of the mine and arrange to have the treasure taken away. While he was there, orders arrived for him to locate a depository farther back in the SHAEF zone and supervise the moving. (Under the Big Three arrangements, the part of Germany containing Merkers would be taken over by the Soviets for military government control after the fighting ended.) Bernstein and Barrett spent Tuesday looking for a site and finally settled on the Reichsbank building in Frankfurt.

== Attempted recovery ==
Much of the gold was not recovered by the Allies, with only $18.5m of the looted $240m the neutral countries (excluding Switzerland) received in trade returned to the Tripartite Gold Commission; almost $15 million of this was from Sweden. That country separately provided about $66m of the $100m provided by it, Argentina, Portugal, Spain, Sweden, and Turkey, of about $480m sought for Europe overall. Eizenstat noted that although there were Argentine sympathies to the Axis, it was still unknown whether the country received any actual looted gold. He also recounts that after the war, the U.S. held that nations only had to return looted gold if they had purchased it directly from the Reichsbank, allowing the U.S. to accept such material as collateral for private loans to Spain.

The fate of the Nazi gold that disappeared into European banking institutions in 1945 has also been the subject of several books and conspiracy theories.

=== Alleged Vatican holdings ===
On October 21, 1946, the U.S. State Department received a top-secret report from U.S. Treasury Agent Emerson Bigelow. The report established that Bigelow received reliable information on the matter from the American Office of Strategic Services or U.S. Army Criminal Investigation Command intelligence officials of the U.S. Army. The document, referred to as the "Bigelow Report" (oftentimes as the Bigelow dispatch, or Bigelow memo) was declassified on December 31, 1996, and released in 1997.

The report asserted that in 1945, the Vatican had confiscated 350 million Swiss francs ($1.5b 2020) in Nazi gold for "safekeeping," of which 150 million Swiss francs had been impounded by British authorities at the Austro-Swiss border. The report also stated that the balance of the gold was held in one of the Vatican's numbered Swiss bank accounts. Intelligence reports, which corroborated the Bigelow Report, also suggested that more than 200 million Swiss francs, a sum largely in gold coins, were eventually transferred to Vatican City or to the Vatican Bank, with the assistance of Roman Catholic clergy and the Franciscan Order.

Such claims, however, are denied by the Vatican Bank. Vatican spokesman Joaquin Navarro-Valls stated that "There is no basis in reality to the [Bigelow] report". In January 2000, a California civil lawsuit was brought against the Vatican Bank, the Franciscan Order and other defendants. It did not claim that the gold was then in the Vatican Bank's possession and was later dismissed.

== See also ==
- August Frank memorandum
- Chiemsee Cauldron
- Collaboration with Nazi Germany and Fascist Italy § Business collaboration
- Confederate gold
- Gold laundering
- Lake Toplitz
- List of missing treasure
- Montagu Norman, 1st Baron Norman
- Moscow gold
- Nazi dental gold
- Nazi gold train
- Romanian Treasure – the Romanian gold reserves sent (alongside other valuable objects) to Russia for safekeeping during World War I, but never returned
- Yamashita's gold
