= Transition from Ming to Qing =

Period of Chinese history (1618–1683)

Ming-Qing transition
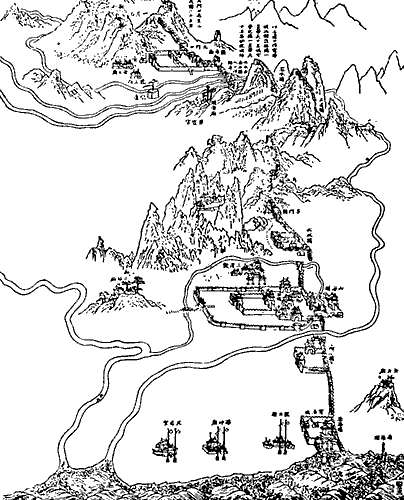
- Battle of Shanhai Pass, one of the major battles during the Ming–Qing transition
Date	c. 1618–1683
Location	Modern-day Mainland China, Korea, Mongolia, Taiwan and parts of Russia, Central Asia and Southeast Asia
Result	Qing victory
Territorial changes	Collapse of the Ming dynasty and Southern Ming dynasty; Suppression of the rebel Kingdom of Shu, Xi dynasty, Shun dynasty, and Kingdom of Tungning; Consolidation of Qing dynasty rule in China proper

Belligerents
Qing dynasty Aisin-Gioro clan Manchus; Ming defectors Southern and Eastern Mongols; Joseon (Korea; after 1636)	Ming dynasty (1618–1644) Southern Ming dynasty (1644–1662): Nanjing court (1644–1645); Fuzhou court (1645–1646); Guangzhou court (1646–1647); Nanning court (1646–1662); Koxinga; Combat support: Joseon (Korea; until 1636); Yehe Jurchens; Kingdom of Tungning (1661–1683); Northern Yuan dynasty (1618–1635); Chagatai Yarkent Khanate (1646–1650); Kumul Khanate; Turpan Khanate Armament support: Tokugawa Shogunate (Japan); Kingdom of Portugal	Shun dynasty (Li Zicheng) Xi dynasty (Zhang Xianzhong) Kingdom of Shu (She–An Rebellion) Evenk-Daur federation Nanai Hurka

Commanders and leaders
Nurhaci (WIA); Hong Taiji; Daišan; Dodo (WIA); Dorgon; Ajige; Oboi; Shunzhi Emperor; Jirgalang (WIA); Hooge; Fan Wencheng; Manggūltai; Abatai; Amin; Sonin; Bolo; Ebilun; Suksaha; Laimbu; Li Shuaitai; Yao Qisheng; Kangxi Emperor; Li Yongfang (defected in 1618); Geng Zhongming (defected in 1633); Kong Youde (defected in 1633) †; Shang Kexi (defected); Zu Dashou (defected in 1642); Wu Sangui (defected in 1644) (WIA); Hong Chengchou (defected); Shi Lang (defected); Zheng Zhilong (defected) (executed); Meng Qiaofang (defected); Zhang Cunren (defected); Sun Kewang (defected); Wang Fuchen (defected)	Chongzhen Emperor; Sun Chengzong †; Mao Wenlong (executed); Yuan Chonghuan (executed); Lu Xiangsheng †; Man Gui †; Ma Shilong; Zhu Shichuan, Prince of Yanchang †; Milayin (米喇印) †; Ding Guodong (丁國棟) †; Sun Chuanting †; Cao Wenzhao †; Shi Kefa (executed); Koxinga; Li Dingguo; Qin Liangyu; Ou Guangchen (executed); Zuo Liangyu; Zhu Youlang, Prince of Gui (Yongli Emperor) (executed); Zhu Yujian, Prince of Tang (Longwu Emperor) (executed); Zhu Yousong, Prince of Fu (Hongguang Emperor) (executed); Zhu Youzhen, Prince of Yi (executed); Zhu Yihai, Prince of Lu; Zhu Shugui, Prince of Ningjing; Supported by: Ligdan Khan; Gintaisi (executed); Sa'id Baba; Turumtay †; Sultan Khan; Zhu Hengjia, Prince of Jingjiang (executed) Zhu Yuyue, Prince of Tang (Shaowu Emperor) (executed)	Li Zicheng; Ma Shouying; Liu Zongmin †; Li Guo; Li Laiheng †; Hao Yaoqi (executed); Yuan Zongdi (executed); Wang Deren (executed); Gao Yigong †; Liu Tichun; Zhang Xianzhong †; Li Dingguo; Sun Kewang; Liu Wenxiu; Ai Nengqi †; Bai Wenxuan; She Chongming; An Bangyan; Bombogor (executed) Sosoku

Strength
Manchu, Mongol, Han Bannermen Han Green Standard Army defectors (after 1644) By 1648, Han Bannermen made up 75% of the Eight Banners while Manchus at only 16%.	Han Chinese soldiers, Hui Muslim soldiers, and Mongol cavalry	Shun dynasty army varies between 60,000 and 100,000 men Zhang Xianzhong's army – 100,000 men 300,000 Yi fighters Nanai Hurka: 6,000

Casualties and losses
- 25,000,000 deaths overall, including civilians

The transition from Ming to Qing, also known as the Manchu conquest of China or Ming–Qing transition, was a decades-long period of conflict between the Qing dynasty, established by the Manchu Aisin Gioro clan in Manchuria, and the Ming dynasty in China proper and later in South China. Various other regional or temporary powers were also involved in this conflict, such as the short-lived Shun dynasty. In 1618, Nurhaci, the leader of the Aisin Gioro clan, commissioned a document titled the Seven Grievances, in which he listed complaints against the Ming before launching a rebellion. Many of the grievances concerned conflicts with the Yehe, a major Manchu clan, and the Ming's favoritism toward the Yehe at the expense of other Manchu clans. Nurhaci's demand that the Ming pay tribute to address the Seven Grievances was effectively a declaration of war, as the Ming were unwilling to pay money to a former vassal. Shortly thereafter, Nurhaci began to rebel against the Ming in Liaoning, a region in southern Manchuria.

At the same time, the Ming dynasty was struggling to survive amid increasing fiscal troubles and peasant rebellions. On April 24, 1644, Beijing fell to a rebel army led by Li Zicheng, a former minor Ming official who became the leader of the peasant revolt. Li then proclaimed the Shun dynasty. At the time of the city's fall, the last Ming emperor, the Chongzhen Emperor, hanged himself on a tree in the imperial garden outside the Forbidden City. As Li Zicheng advanced toward him with his army, the general Wu Sangui, tasked by the Ming with guarding one of the gates of the Great Wall, swore allegiance to the Manchus and allowed them to enter China. Li Zicheng was defeated at the battle of Shanhai Pass by the combined forces of Wu Sangui and the Manchu prince Dorgon. On June 6, the Manchus and Wu entered the capital and proclaimed the young Shunzhi Emperor as the new Emperor of China.

However, the conquest was far from complete, and it took nearly forty more years before all of China was firmly united under Qing rule. The Kangxi Emperor ascended the throne in 1661, and in 1662 his regents initiated the Great Clearance to defeat the resistance of Ming loyalists in South China. He then fought several rebellions, such as the revolt of the Three Feudatories, led by Wu Sangui, which broke out in southern China in 1673. He subsequently launched a series of campaigns that expanded his empire. In 1662, the general Koxinga expelled Dutch colonists and founded the Kingdom of Tungning in Taiwan, a Ming loyalist state, with the aim of reconquering China. However, Tungning was defeated in 1683 at the battle of Penghu by Admiral Shi Lang, who had previously served under Koxinga.

The fall of the Ming dynasty resulted from a combination of factors. Kenneth Swope argues that a key factor was the deterioration of relations between the Ming royalty and the military leaders of the Ming Empire. Other factors include repeated military expeditions in the north, inflationary pressures caused by excessive spending by the imperial treasury, natural disasters, and epidemics. A peasant rebellion in Beijing in 1644 and a series of weak emperors contributed to the chaos. The Ming power survived for years in what is now southern China, though it was ultimately defeated by the Manchus.

== Overview ==
The transition from the Ming to Qing was a decades-long period of conflict between:

1. the Qing dynasty, established by the Manchu clan Aisin Gioro in contemporary Northeast China;
2. the Ming dynasty, the incumbent dynasty led by the Zhu clan;
3. and various other rebel powers in China, such as the short-lived Xi dynasty led by Zhang Xianzhong and the short-lived Shun dynasty led by Li Zicheng.

Leading up to the Qing, in 1618, the Later Jin khan Nurhaci commissioned a document entitled the Seven Grievances, which enumerated grievances against the Ming. Nurhaci, leader of the Jianzhou Jurchens, was originally a Ming vassal who officially considered himself a local representative of imperial Ming power, but he broke his relationship with the Ming with the establishment of the Later Jin dynasty in 1616 after he unified Jurchen tribes. Many of the grievances he presented dealt with conflicts against the Ming-backed Yehe clan of the Jurchens. Nurhaci's demand that the Ming pay tribute to him to redress the Seven Grievances was effectively a declaration of war, as the Ming were not willing to pay money to a former vassal. Shortly afterwards, Nurhaci rebelled against Ming rule in Liaoning.

At the same time, the Ming dynasty was fighting for its survival against fiscal turmoil and peasant rebellions. Han Chinese officials urged Nurhaci's successor Hong Taiji to crown himself emperor, which he did in 1636, declaring the new Qing dynasty. On 24 April 1644, Beijing fell to a rebel army led by Li Zicheng, a former minor Ming official who became the leader of the peasant revolt and then proclaimed the Shun dynasty. The last Ming emperor, the Chongzhen Emperor, hanged himself from the Zuihuai tree in the imperial garden outside the Forbidden City. When Li Zicheng moved against him, the Ming general Wu Sangui shifted his allegiance to the Qing. Li Zicheng was defeated at the Battle of Shanhai Pass by the joint forces of Wu Sangui and Manchu prince Dorgon. On 6 June, the mainly Han Chinese forces of Dorgon and Wu entered the capital.

The fall of the Ming dynasty was largely caused by a combination of factors. Scholars have argued that the fall of the Ming dynasty may have been partially caused by the droughts and famines caused by the Little Ice Age. Historian Kenneth Swope argues that one key factor was deteriorating relations between Ming royalty and the Ming Empire's military leadership. Other factors include repeated military expeditions to the north, inflationary pressures caused by spending too much from the imperial treasury, natural disasters and epidemics of disease. Contributing further to the chaos was a peasant rebellion throughout the country in 1644 and a series of weak emperors. Ming power would hold out in what is now southern China for years, though eventually would be overtaken by the Qing forces. Other authors have linked the fall of the Ming with the General Crisis affecting the Spanish Empire under Philip IV, the English Civil War and other polities.

It took almost 40 more years after the fall of the Ming before all of China was securely united under Qing rule. By the mid-1600s, there were eleven emergent regimes which purported to be the authentic Ming. The Qing dated the founding of the dynasty to June 1644 but transitional warfare continued until 1683.

In 1661, the Kangxi Emperor ascended the throne, and in 1662 his regents launched the Great Clearance to defeat the resistance of Ming loyalists in South China. He then fought off several rebellions, such as the Revolt of the Three Feudatories led by Wu Sangui in southern China, starting in 1673, and then countered by launching a series of campaigns that expanded his empire. In 1662, Zheng Chenggong (Koxinga) drove out and defeated the Dutch and founded the Kingdom of Tungning in Taiwan, a Ming loyalist state with the goal of reunifying China. However, Tungning was defeated in 1683 at the Battle of Penghu by Han Chinese admiral Shi Lang, a former admiral under Koxinga.

The Qing conquest depended heavily on the defection of the Ming dynasty's Liaodong military establishment and other defectors, with the Manchu Banner forces constituting a relatively small fraction of Qing military strength relative to the Green Standard Army. However, historian Michael Fredholm von Essen argues that the Manchu military's organization into combined-arms forces integrating cavalry, infantry, and artillery was the decisive factor in the Qing's ability to defeat numerically superior Ming armies, and that the Banner armies constituted the Qing's main battle force.

=== Jurchens and the late Ming dynasty ===
Central Asia in 1636. The Ming dynasty previously ruled over the Aisin Gioro Clan and Jurchens. The Manchus and Qing dynasty started from northeastern China and spread throughout the rest of China.

The Manchus are sometimes described as a nomadic people, when in fact they were not nomads, but a sedentary agricultural people who lived in fixed villages, farmed crops, and practiced hunting and mounted archery. Their main military formation was infantry wielding bows and arrows, swords, and pikes, while cavalry was kept in the rear.

Manchus were living in cities with walls surrounded by villages and adopting Han Chinese-style agriculture well before the Qing conquest of the Ming, and there was an established tradition of Han Chinese-Manchu mixing before 1644. The Han Chinese soldiers on the Liaodong frontier often mixed with non-Han tribesmen and were largely acculturated to their ways. The Jurchen Manchus accepted and assimilated Han soldiers who went over to them, and Han Chinese soldiers from Liaodong often adopted and used Manchu names. Indeed Nurhaci's secretary Dahai may have been one such individual.

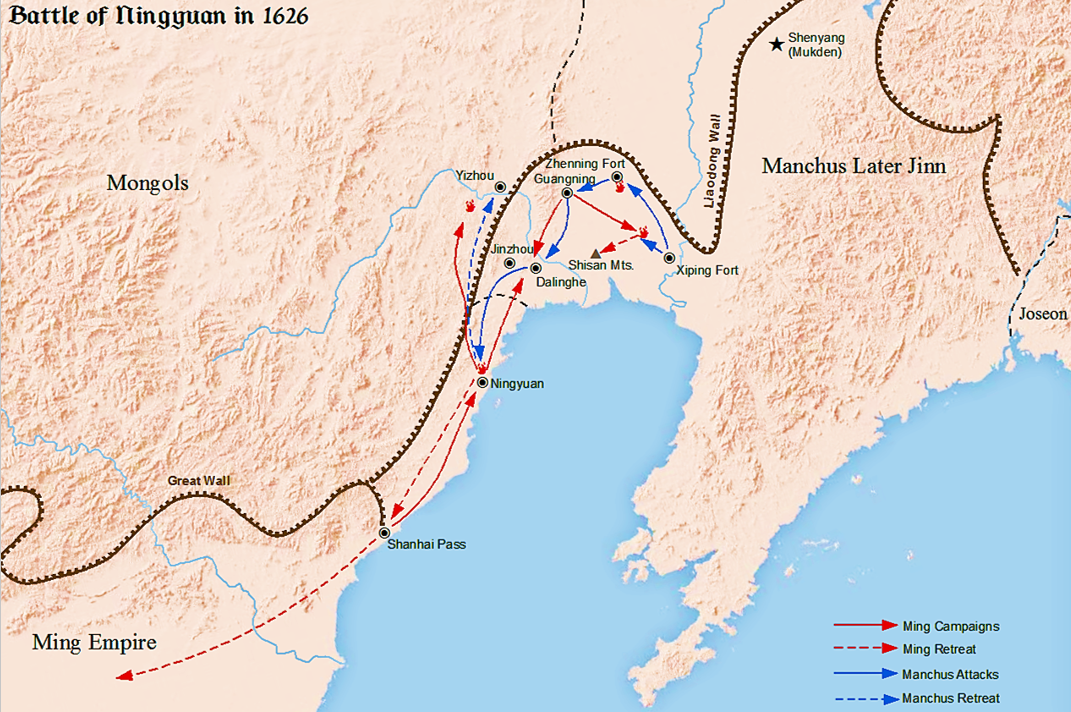
Battle of Ningyuan between Ming and Manchus

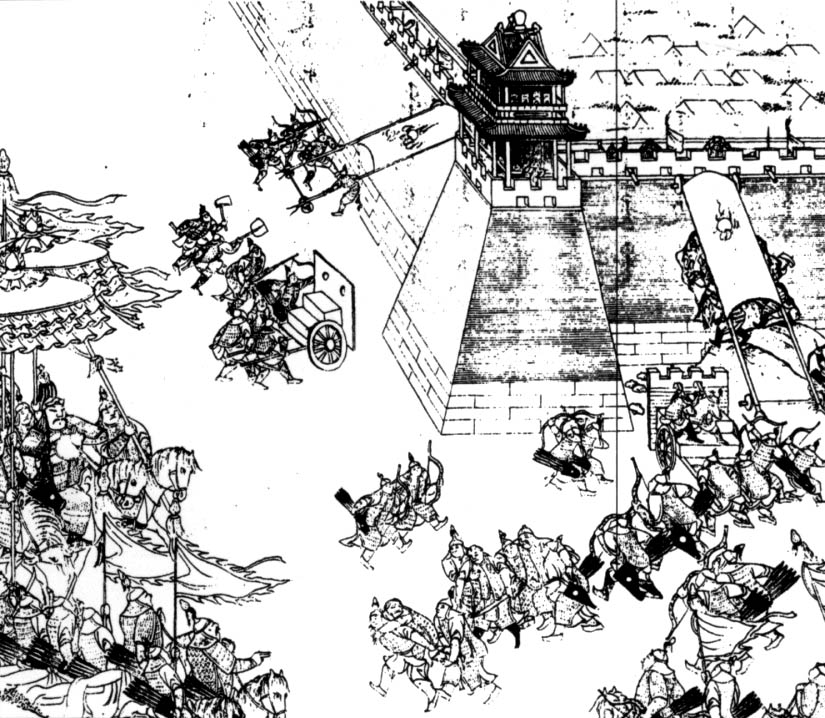
Battle of Ningyuan, where Nurhaci was injured in defeat

In the late Ming dynasty, Ming army units had become dominated by officers who would spend long periods of 10 or 12 years in command instead of the usual practice of constant rotation, and the Central Military Command had lost much of its control over regional armies. Zongdu Junwu, or Supreme Commanders, were appointed throughout the empire to oversee the fiscal and military affairs in the area of their jurisdiction. In the frontier areas these became increasingly autonomous, and especially in Liaodong, where military service and command became hereditary and vassalage-like personal bonds of loyalty grew between officers, their subordinates, and troops. This military caste gravitated toward the Jurchen tribal chieftains rather than the bureaucrats of the capital.

The She-An Rebellion among the Yi people broke out in Sichuan in 1621 against the Ming, requiring suppression, which was completed in 1629. In the early 1640s, mass rebellions led by many rebel leaders broke out in northwestern China's province of Shaanxi and spread throughout China in the 1640s. Major battles included the sacking of Fengyang by Li Zicheng and Zhang Xianzhong and a battle in Kaifeng which led to the deliberately engineered 1642 Yellow River flood by the Ming governor in an attempt to stop Li Zicheng.

== Initial Jurchen conquests ==
=== Conquest of Liaodong and other Jurchen tribes (1601–1626) ===
The Jianzhou Jurchen chief, Nurhaci, is retrospectively identified as the founder of the Qing dynasty. In 1589 the Ming dynasty appointed Nurhaci as paramount chieftain of the Yalu Region, believing that his tribe was too weak to gain hegemony over the larger Yehe and Hada. When the other tribes attacked him to check his power in 1591, he succeeded in defeating them and seized many of their warhorses.

During much of his early life Nurhaci considered himself a guardian of the Ming border and a local representative of imperial Ming power. Upon the advice of an Erdeni, most likely a Chinese transfrontiersman, he proclaimed the Later Jin dynasty in 1616, named after the Jurchen-led Jin dynasty that had ruled over northern China several centuries earlier, and declared himself Khan. His efforts to unify Jurchen tribes gave the Jurchen the strength to assert themselves backed by an army consisting of majority Han Chinese defectors as well as Ming produced firearms. In 1618, Nurhaci openly renounced the Ming overlordship and proclaimed his Seven Grievances against the Ming and departed his capital of Hetu Ala with 20,000 men. The army attacked and captured Fushun, located on the Hun River about 10 kilometers east of Shenyang.

The Hulun tribes, a powerful confederacy of Jurchen tribes, started recognizing the authority of Nurhaci by the beginning of the 17th century. In some cases, such as with Bujantai of the Ula, chieftains would attempt to reassert their independence and war would break out, but the Jianzhou Jurchens would defeat and assimilate all the tribes eventually (Hada 1601, Hoifa 1607, Ula 1613, Yehe 1619). The powerful Yehe Jurchens under Gintaisi united with the forces of the Ming dynasty to combat the rise of Nurhaci but Gintaisi was defeated and died in 1619. The fur-trapping Warka peoples near the Pacific coast were subjugated as tributary tribes from 1599 to 1641.

By summer 1621, the Ming's Liaodong fortress cities, Fushun, Shenyang, and Liaoyang, were all handed over to the Later Jin by traitors and defectors. Fushun's commander surrendered after a single attack when promised that his troops and their families would not be enslaved or forced to change any of their customs (including hairstyle), but rather given high office. Shenyang fell with the aid of Mongol Ming soldiers in the city; Liaoyang fell after traitors let down ropes for the Jurchens to climb the wall in the night. The Ming general Li Yongfang who surrendered the city of Fushun in what is now Liaoning province in China's northeast did so after Nurhaci gave him an Aisin Gioro princess in marriage and a noble title. The princess was one of Nurhaci's granddaughters. In April 1625, Nurhaci designated Shenyang the new capital city, which would hold that status until the Qing conquest of Beijing in 1644. In 1625, the Jurchens captured the port city of Lüshun, thus controlling the whole Liaodong peninsula.

When the Jurchens were reorganized by Nurhaci into the Eight Banners, many Manchu clans were artificially created from groups of unrelated people who would found a new Manchu clan (mukun) using a term of geographic origin such as a toponym for their hala (clan name). The irregularities over Jurchen and Manchu clan origin led to the Qing trying to document and systemize the creation of histories for Manchu clans, including manufacturing an entire legend around the origin of the Aisin Gioro clan by taking mythology from the northeast.

Nurhaci read the Chinese novels Romance of the Three Kingdoms and Water Margin, learning all he knew about Chinese military and political strategies from them.

In February 1626, the Jurchens besieged Ningyuan but suffered a defeat in which Nurhaci was mortally wounded.

=== First Joseon campaign ===
The Later Jin had lost at the Battle of Ningyuan the previous year and their khan Nurhaci died from his wounds afterwards. Peace negotiations with the Ming after the battle delayed an aggressive Ming response to the Jurchen loss, and the Ming general Yuan Chonghuan was busy fortifying the border garrisons and training new musketeers. The new khan Hong Taiji was eager for a quick victory to consolidate his position as khan. By invading Joseon he also hoped to extract much-needed resources for his army and subjects, who had suffered in the war against the Ming.

In 1627, Hong Taiji dispatched princes Amin, Jirgalang, Ajige, and Yoto to Joseon with 30,000 troops, under the guidance of Gang Hong-rip and Li Yongfang. The Jurchens met sharp resistance at the border towns but Joseon border garrisons were quickly defeated. The Jurchen army advanced into Uiju where Ming general Mao Wenlong was stationed, and Mao quickly fled with his men into the Bohai Sea. Next, the Jurchens attacked Anju. When it became clear that defeat was inevitable, the Anju garrisons committed suicide by blowing up their gunpowder storehouse. Pyongyang fell without a fight and the Jin army crossed the Taedong River.

By this time news of the invasion had reached the Ming court, which immediately dispatched a relief contingent to Joseon, slowing the Jurchen advance into Hwangju. King Injo then dispatched an envoy to negotiate a peace treaty, but by the time the messenger returned, Injo had already fled from Hanseong to Ganghwa Island in panic.

=== Mongolia campaign (1625–1635) ===
The Khorchin Mongols allied with Nurhaci and the Jurchens in 1626, submitting to his rule for protection against the Khalkha Mongols and Chahar Mongols. Seven Khorchin nobles died at the hands of Khalkhas and Chahars in 1625. This started the Khorchin alliance with the Qing.

The Chahar Mongols were fought against by Dorgon in 1628 and 1635. An expedition against the Chahar Mongols in 1632 was ordered to establish a trading post at Zhangjiakou. The Qing defeated the armies of the Mongol khan Ligdan, who was allied to the Ming, bringing an end to his rule over the Northern Yuan. The defeat of Ligdan Khan in 1634, in addition to winning the allegiance of the Southern Mongol hordes, brought a vast supply of horses to the Qing, while denying the same supply to the Ming. The Qing also captured the Great Seal of the Mongol Khans, giving them the opportunity to portray themselves as heirs of the Yuan dynasty as well.

== Hong Taiji and formation of the Qing dynasty ==
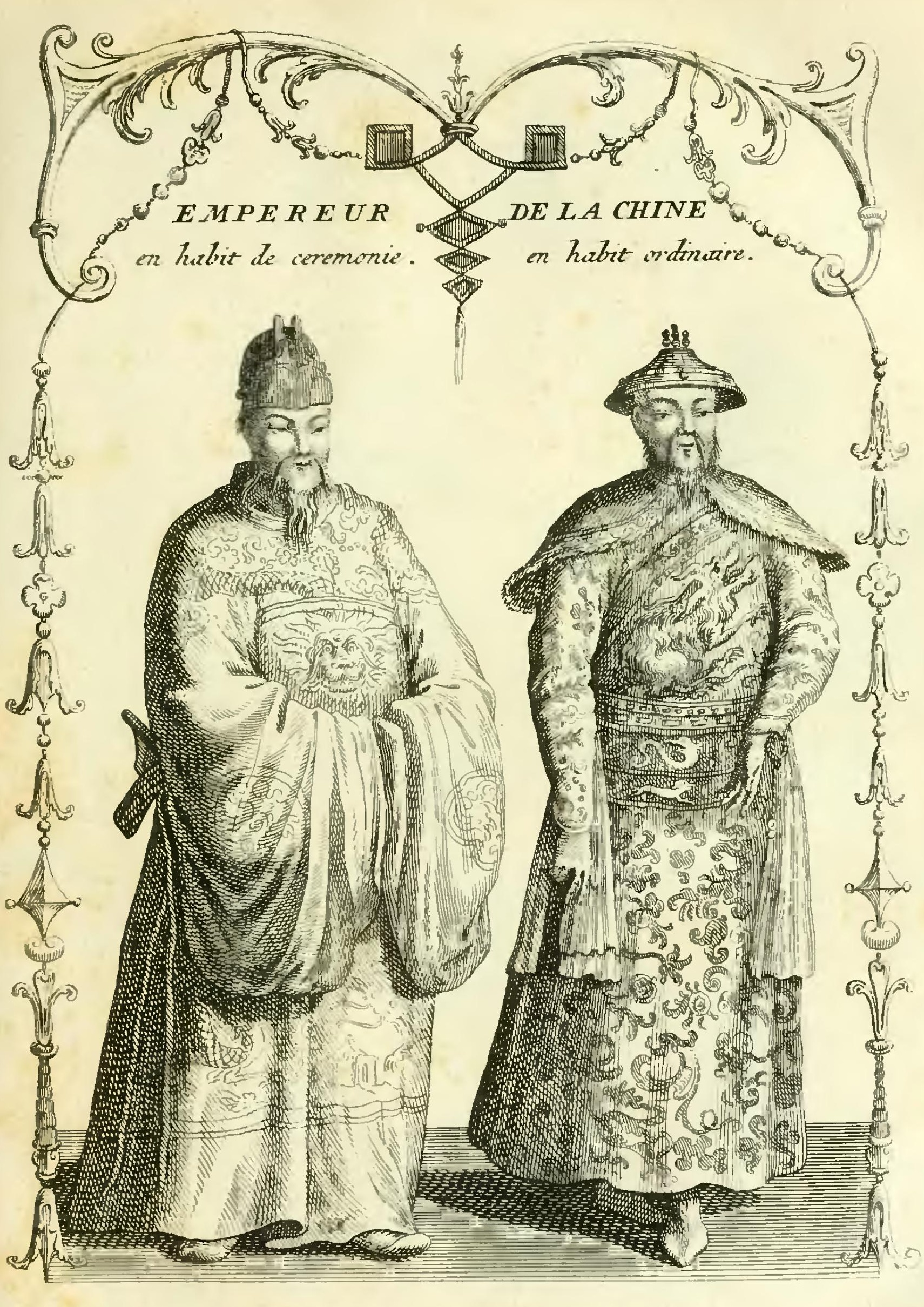
Jesuit missionary illustration of the Ming and Qing Emperor in ordinary uniform

Hong Taiji was the eighth son of Nurhaci, whom he succeeded as the second ruler of the Later Jin dynasty in 1626. He organised imperial examinations to recruit scholar-officials from the Han Chinese, and adopted Chinese legal forms. He formed autonomous Han Chinese military colonies governed by Han Chinese officials, where Manchus were forbidden to trespass. Hong Taiji curtailed the power of the Manchu princes by relying on Han Chinese officials. He personally welcomed surrendered Ming commanders, eating side-by-side with them so as to build a rapport that was impossible with the Ming emperors. The Manchus, led by Prince Amin, expressed their displeasure at the situation by massacring the population of Qian'an and Yongping. Hong Taiji responded by arresting and imprisoning Amin, who later died in prison. He then implemented, on the urging of his Han Chinese advisors, Chinese-style Confucian education, and Ming-style government ministries. When Zhang Chun, a Ming commander, was captured but refused to defect, Hong Taiji personally served him with food to show his sincerity (Zhang still refused but was kept in a temple until his death). With the surrender of Dalinghe in 1631, the most capable army officers of the Ming became faithful followers of the new dynasty who would take over the preparation and planning of much of the war. From this episode onward, the transition ceased to be an inter-nation conflict between Chinese and Manchus but rather a civil war between Mukden and Beijing.

Meanwhile, in the Ming, the Wuqiao mutiny broke out in 1631, led by Kong Youde and Geng Zhongming. Undersupplied and underpaid soldiers mutinied against the Ming dynasty. They subsequently sailed across Bohai Gulf and defected to the Jurchens en masse. During the mutiny, they purged thousands of Southern Chinese, suspecting them to be loyal to the Ming.

Hong Taiji was reluctant to become Emperor of China. However, Han Chinese officials Ning Wanwo (寧完我), Fan Wencheng, Ma Guozhu (馬國柱), Zu Kefa (祖可法), Shen Peirui (沈佩瑞), and Zhang Wenheng (張文衡) urged him to declare himself as Emperor of China. On 14 May 1636, he accepted this advice, changing the name of his regime from Jin to Qing, and enthroning himself as Emperor of China in an elaborate Confucian ceremony.

Hong Taiji's renaming of the Jurchens to Manchus was meant to hide the fact that the Jianzhou Jurchens were vassals of the Han Chinese. The Qing dynasty carefully hid the two original editions of the books of Qing Taizu Wu Huangdi Shilu and the Manzhou Shilu Tu (Taizu Shilu Tu) in the Qing palace, forbidding them from public view, because they showed that the Manchu Aisin-Gioro family had been ruled by the Ming dynasty. In the Ming period, the Koreans of Joseon referred to the Jurchen-inhabited lands north of the Korean peninsula, above the rivers Yalu and Tumen, to be part of Ming China, as the "superior country" (sangguk), the name they used to refer to Ming China. The Qing deliberately excluded references and information from the History of Ming that showed the Jurchens (Manchus) as subservient to the Ming dynasty, to hide their former subservient relationship to the Ming. The Veritable Records of Ming were not used to source the History of Ming because of this. Refusing to mention in the Mingshi that the Qing founders were Ming China's subjects was meant to avoid the accusation of rebellion.

=== Han–Manchu marriages ===
Han Chinese generals who defected to the Manchus were often given women from the imperial Aisin-Gioro family in marriage. Manchu Aisin-Gioro princesses were also married to Han Chinese officials' sons. The Manchu leader Nurhaci married one of his granddaughters (Abatai's daughter) to the Ming general Li Yongfang after he surrendered Fushun in Liaoning to the Manchus in 1618. The offspring of Li Yongfang received the "Third Class Baron" (三等子爵; sān děng zǐjué) title. Li Yongfang was the great-great-great-grandfather of Li Shiyao. The 4th daughter of Kangxi was wedded to Sun Cheng'en, son of the Han Chinese Sun Sike. Other Aisin-Gioro women married the sons of the Han Chinese generals Geng Jimao, Shang Kexi, and Wu Sangui. Meanwhile, the ordinary soldiers who defected were often given non-royal Manchu women as wives, and a mass marriage of Han Chinese officers and officials to Manchu women numbering 1,000 couples was arranged by Prince Yoto and Khan Hong Taiji in 1632 to promote harmony between the two ethnic groups.

This policy, which began before the invasion of 1644, was continued after it. A 1648 decree from Shunzhi allowed Han Chinese civilian men to marry Manchu women from the Banners with the permission of the Board of Revenue if they were registered daughters of officials or commoners or the permission of their banner company captain if they were unregistered commoners, and it was only later in the dynasty that these policies allowing intermarriage were done away with. The decree was formulated by Prince Dorgon. In the beginning of the Qing dynasty the Qing government supported Han Chinese defectors weddings to Manchu girls. Han Chinese Bannermen wedded Manchus and there was no law against this.

The "Dolo efu" rank was given to husbands of Qing princesses. Geng Zhongming, a Han Chinese bannerman, was awarded the title of Prince Jingnan, and his son Geng Jingmao managed to have both his sons Geng Jingzhong and Geng Zhaozhong become court attendants under the Shunzhi Emperor and married Aisin-Gioro women, with Prince Abatai's granddaughter marrying Geng Zhaozhong and Haoge's (a son of Hong Taiji) daughter marrying Geng Jingzhong. A daughter of the Manchu Aisin-Gioro Prince Yolo was wedded to Geng Juzhong, who was another son of Geng Jingmao. Aisin-Gioro women were also offered to Mongols who defected to the Manchus. The Manchu Prince Regent Dorgon gave a Manchu woman as a wife to the Han Chinese official Feng Quan, who had defected from the Ming to the Qing. Feng Quan willingly adopted the Manchu queue hairstyle before it was enforced on the Han Chinese population and he also learned the Manchu language.

=== Building a mixed military ===
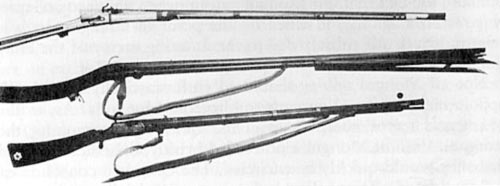
Ming firearms

When Li Yongfang surrendered, he was given much higher status than under the Ming, and even allowed to keep his troops as retainers. Kong Youde, Shang Kexi and Geng Zhongming were also allowed to keep their personal armies. The warlord Shen Zhixiang, who had unlawfully taken over command of his deceased uncle Shen Shikui's troops as his private army, was unable to attain recognition from the Ming court. He then proceeded to lead his forces to switch allegiance to the Qing, and they became critical assets to the Qing.

There were too few ethnic Manchus to rule China, but they absorbed defeated Mongols, and, more importantly, added Han Chinese to the Eight Banners. The Manchus had to create an entire "Jiu Han jun" (Old Han Army) due to the very large number of Han Chinese soldiers absorbed into the Eight Banners by both capture and defection. The Qing showed that the Manchus valued military skills in propaganda targeted towards the Ming military to get them to defect to the Qing, since the Ming civilian political system discriminated against the military. From 1618 to 1631 Manchus received Han Chinese defectors and their descendants became Han Bannermen and those killed in battle were commemorated as martyrs in biographies.

Hong Taiji recognized that Ming defectors were needed in order to defeat the Ming, explaining to other Manchus why he needed to treat the Ming defector general Hong Chengchou leniently. Hong Taiji understood that the Ming would not be easily defeated unless Han Chinese troops wielding musket and cannon were included in the army. Indeed, among the Banners, gunpowder weapons like muskets and artillery were specifically used by the Han Chinese Banners. The Manchus established an artillery corps made out of Han Chinese soldiers in 1641. The use of artillery by Han Bannermen may have led to them being known as "heavy" soldiers (ujen cooha). The "red coat cannon" were part of the Han army (Liaodong Han Chinese) serving the Qing.

Ming officers who defected to the Qing were allowed to retain their previous military rank. The Qing received the defection of Shen Zhixiang in 1638. Among the other Han Chinese officers who defected to the Qing were Zu Dashou, Geng Zhongming, Hong Chengchou, Shang Kexi, Zhang Cunren, and Kong Youde. Aristocratic and military ranks, silver, horses and official positions were given to Han Chinese defectors like Zhang Cunren. Han Chinese defectors were primarily responsible for military strategy after 1631.

So many Han defected to the Qing and swelled up the ranks of the Eight Banners that ethnic Manchus became a minority within the Banners, making up only 16% in 1648, with Han Chinese Bannermen dominating at 75% and Mongol Bannermen making up the rest. It was this multi-ethnic force in which Manchus were only a minority, which unified China for the Qing. The Qing takeover was done by the multi-ethnic Han Chinese Banners, Mongol Banners, and Manchu Banners which made up the Qing military. In 1644, Ming China was invaded by an army that had only a fraction of Manchus, being multi-ethnic, with Han Chinese Banners, Mongol Banners, and Manchu Banners. The political barrier was between the commoners made out of non-bannermen Han Chinese and the "conquest elite", made out of Han Chinese bannermen, nobles, and Mongols and Manchu. Ethnicity was not the determining factor. Han Chinese (Nikan) bannermen used banners of black color and Nurhaci was guarded by Han Chinese soldiers. Other banners became a minority compared to the Han Chinese (Nikan) Black Banner detachments during Nurhaci's reign.

== Lead-up to the Great Wall ==
=== Second Joseon campaign (1636–1637) ===
The Later Jin had forced Joseon to open markets near the borders because its conflicts with Ming had brought economic hardship and starvation to Jin subjects. Joseon was also forced to transfer suzerainty of the Warka tribe to Jin. Furthermore, a tribute of 100 horses, 100 tiger and leopard skins, 400 bolts of cotton, and 15,000 pieces of cloth was to be extracted and gifted to the Jin Khan. King Injo's brother was sent to deliver this tribute. However, in later letters to the Joseon king, Hong Taiji would complain that the Koreans did not behave as if they had lost, and were not abiding by the terms of the agreement. Joseon merchants and markets continued to trade with Ming and actively aided Ming subjects by providing them with grain and rations. Hong Taiji rebuked them, saying that the food of Joseon should only be fed to Joseon subjects.

Prior to the invasion, Hong Taiji sent princes Abatai, Jirgalang, and Ajige to secure the coastal approaches to Korea, so that Ming could not send reinforcements. On 9 December 1636, Hong Taiji led Manchu, Mongol, and Han Chinese Banners against Joseon. Chinese support was particularly evident in the army's artillery and naval contingents. The defected Ming mutineer Kong Youde, ennobled as the Qing's Prince Gongshun, joined the attacks on Ganghwa and Ka ("Pidao"). The defectors Geng Zhongming and Shang Kexi also played prominent roles in the Korean invasion.

After the Second Manchu invasion of Korea, Joseon Korea was forced to give several of their royal princesses as concubines to the Qing Manchu regent Prince Dorgon. In 1650 Dorgon married the Korean Princess Uisun. The princess' name in Korean was Uisun and she was Prince Yi Kaeyoon's (Kumrimgoon) daughter. Dorgon married two Korean princesses at Lianshan.

=== Campaigns against the Amur tribes ===
The Qing defeated the Evenk-Daur federation led by Evenki chief Bombogor and beheaded Bombogor in 1640, with Qing armies massacring and deporting Evenkis and absorbing the survivors into the Eight Banners. The Nanais at first fought against Nurhaci and the Manchus, led by their own Nanai Hurka chief Sosoku before surrendering to Hong Taiji in 1631. Mandatory shaving of the front of all male heads was imposed on Amur peoples conquered by the Qing like the Nanais. The Amur peoples already wore the queue on the back of their heads but did not shave the front until the Qing subjected them and ordered them to shave. The Qing married off Manchu princesses to Amur chiefs who submitted to their rule. The Daurs and Tungusic peoples of the Amur region (Evenks, Nanais) and other ethnicities of this region were absorbed into the Qing Eight Banners system.

=== Liaoxi campaign (1638–1642) ===
In 1638, Qing armies raided deep into the interior of China as far as Jinan in Shandong province and immediately retreated back across the Great Wall. The Ming emperor insisted on concentrating all efforts at fighting the rebel armies instead, likening the Qing to be a mere "skin rash" while the rebels were a "visceral disease". In 1641, Jinzhou was besieged by a force of over 30 cannons of Han Chinese banner artillery under Manchu prince Jirgalang, with supporting Korean artillery under the command of Yu Im. The Koreans, however, were incapacitated by outbreaks of disease. The fortress city of Songshan fell next after a major battle, due to the defection and betrayal of Ming commander Xia Chengde. The emperor responded by ordering the Ningyuan garrison commander Wu Sangui to go on the offense, but he was quickly repelled. Manchu prince Abatai then led another raid into the interior of China, reaching the northern Jiangsu province and looting 12,000 gold taels and 2,200,000 silver taels. Ming Grand Secretary Zhou Yanru refused to engage in battle, while fabricating reports of victory and extorting bribes to cover up for defeats. Prince-Regent Dorgon later told his officials how "it was really very comical" reading captured Ming military reports, because most were fabricated stories of victory. Meanwhile, rebel "bandits" continued advancing. After the fall of Songshan, amid the urging of his brother and sons (formerly also Ming generals) to join them in defecting to the Qing, the commander of Jinzhou, Zu Dashou, also defected on 8 April 1642, handing them the city. With the fall of Songshan and Jinzhou, the Ming defense system in Liaoxi collapsed, leaving Wu Sangui's forces near the Shanhai Pass as the last barrier on the Qing armies' way to Beijing.

== Beijing and the north (1644) ==
In their later years, the Ming faced a number of famines and floods as well as economic chaos, and rebellions. Li Zicheng rebelled in the 1630s in Shaanxi in the north.

A rebellion by Zhang Xianzhong developed in Shaanxi and Henan. After gaining control of parts of Hubei province, Zhang declared himself "King of the West". Historians estimated that up to one million people were killed in Zhang's reign.

Just as Dorgon, whom historians have variously called "the mastermind of the Qing conquest" and "the principal architect of the great Manchu enterprise", and his advisors were pondering how to attack the Ming, the peasant rebellions ravaging northern China were approaching dangerously close to the Ming capital Beijing. In February 1644, rebel leader Li Zicheng had founded the Shun dynasty in Xi'an and proclaimed himself king. In March, his armies had captured the important city of Taiyuan in Shanxi. Seeing the progress of the rebels, on 5 April, the Ming Chongzhen Emperor requested the urgent help of any military commandant in the empire. On 24 April, Li Zicheng breached the walls of Beijing, and the emperor hanged himself the next day on a hill behind the Forbidden City. He was the last Ming emperor to reign in Beijing.

The Qing made a proposal to Li Zicheng's Shun forces on 6 March 1644 that they should ally and divide northern China between the Shun and Qing, sending a delegation to propose a joint attack on the Ming to take over the Central Plains. The Shun received the letter.

When Li Zicheng and his army reached Beijing, he had made an offer via the former Ming eunuch Du Xun to the Chongzhen Emperor of the Ming dynasty that Li Zicheng would fight the Qing dynasty and eradicate all other rebels on behalf of the Ming, if the Ming dynasty would recognize Li Zicheng's control over his Shaanxi-Shanxi fief, pay him 1 million taels and confirm Li Zicheng's noble rank of Prince. Li Zicheng did not intend to overthrow the Ming Emperor or kill him. The Ming Emperor, however, fearful that accepting such political expediency would ruin his reputation tried to get Wei Zaode, the Chief Grand Secretary, to agree with the decision and shoulder the responsibility of the decision. Wei Zaode refused to answer, so the Chongzhen Emperor rejected Li Zicheng's terms. Li Zicheng marched into the capital as Ming officials surrendered and defected. Li Zicheng still did not intend to kill the Chongzhen Emperor and the Ming Crown Prince, intending to recognise them as nobles of the new Shun dynasty. Li Zicheng lamented the death of the Chongzhen Emperor after discovering he committed suicide, saying that he had come to share power and rule together with him. Li Zicheng distrusted the Ming officials who defected to his side when the Ming fell, viewing them as the reason for the Ming demise. After declaring his own Shun dynasty in Beijing, Li Zicheng sent an offer to the powerful Ming general at the Great Wall, Wu Sangui, to defect to his side in exchange for a high noble rank and title. Wu Sangui dallied for days before he decided to accept the rank and defect to Li Zicheng. Wu Sangui was on his way to formally capitulate and defect to Li Zicheng, but by that time Li Zicheng thought Wu Sangui's silence meant he had rejected the offer and ordered Wu Sangui's father to be beheaded. This caused Wu Sangui to defect to the Qing.

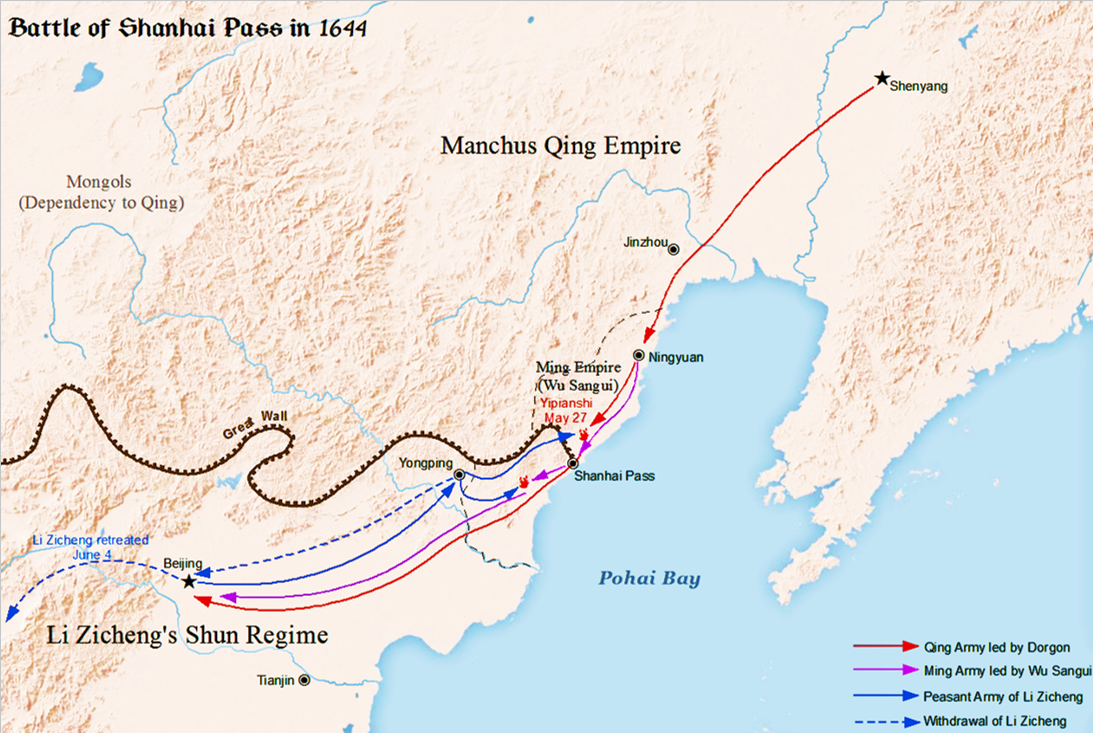
The battle at Shanhai Pass that allowed Manchus to enter China proper

Soon after the emperor had called for help, Ming general Wu Sangui had left his stronghold of Ningyuan north of the Great Wall and started marching toward the capital. On 26 April, his armies had moved through the fortifications of the Shanhai Pass (the eastern end of the Great Wall) and were marching toward Beijing when he heard that the city had fallen, whereupon he returned to the Shanhai Pass. Li Zicheng sent two armies to attack the pass but Wu's battle-hardened troops defeated them easily on 5 May and 10 May. Then on 18 May, Li Zicheng personally led 60,000 of his troops out of Beijing to attack Wu. At the same time, Wu Sangui wrote to Dorgon to request the Qing's help in ousting the bandits and restoring the Ming dynasty.

Meanwhile, Wu Sangui's departure from the stronghold of Ningyuan had left all the territory outside the Great Wall under Qing control. Two of Dorgon's most prominent Chinese advisors, Hong Chengchou and Fan Wencheng, urged the Manchu prince to seize the opportunity of the fall of Beijing to present themselves as avengers of the fallen Ming and to claim the Mandate of Heaven for the Qing. Therefore, when Dorgon received Wu's letter, he was already about to lead an expedition to attack northern China and had no intention to restore the Ming. When Dorgon asked Wu to work for the Qing instead, Wu had little choice but to accept.

After Wu formally surrendered to the Qing in the morning of 27 May, his elite troops charged the rebel army repeatedly, but were unable to break the enemy lines. Dorgon waited until both sides were weakened before ordering his cavalry to gallop around Wu's right wing to charge Li's left flank. Li Zicheng's troops were quickly routed and fled back toward Beijing. After their defeat at the Battle of Shanhai Pass, the Shun troops looted Beijing for several days until Li Zicheng left the capital on 4 June with all the wealth he could carry, one day after he had defiantly proclaimed himself Emperor of the Great Shun.

=== Ethnic situation ===
The conquest of the [Ming] Empire, after the Manchus had securely seated themselves in Peking, had to be undertaken largely with [Han] Chinese troops, "stiffened" a little with a Manchu regiment here and there [...]

— E. H. Parker, The Financial Capacity of China; Journal of the North-China Branch of the Royal Asiatic Society

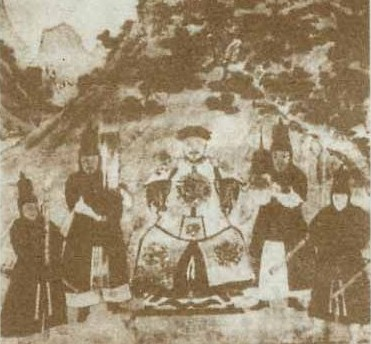
Wu Sangui was a general of the Ming dynasty, who later defected to the Qing dynasty. However, his hopes to restore the former were dashed after he rebelled against the Kangxi Emperor.

The easy transition between the Ming and Qing dynasties has been ascribed to the Chongzhen Emperor's refusal to move southward when his capital had been under rebel threat. This allowed the Qing dynasty to capture an entire corps of qualified civil servants to administer the country, and also ensured that the Southern Ming pretenders would suffer from infighting due to their weak claims on the throne. A large émigré elite of northerners in the south would also have increased the probability of an aggressive policy of reconquest to regain their northern homelands.

Imperial examinations started being organised almost immediately upon the Qing capture of Beijing. The early Qing government was dominated by scholars from North China, and a strong factional rivalry between Northern and Southern scholars ensued. Ming dynasty officials in the finance, appointments and military departments largely joined the new dynasty and formed the core of the Qing civil service, but not the staff of rites, music and literature (the Qing may not have prioritised these either). These defectors were responsible for easing the transition of government without major setbacks. A large proportion of military officials and civilian officials in the Board of War were given promotions after defecting. The top positions were mainly in the hands of Han Chinese Bannermen from Liaodong.

When Dorgon ordered Han Chinese civilians to vacate Beijing's inner city and move to the outskirts, he resettled the inner city with the Bannermen, including Han Chinese bannermen. Later, some exceptions were made, allowing Han Chinese civilians who held government or commercial jobs to also reside in the inner city. The civilian government was flooded by Han Chinese Bannermen. The Six Boards President and other major positions were filled with Han Chinese Bannermen chosen by the Qing.

It was Han Chinese Bannermen who were responsible for the successful Qing takeover. They made up the majority of governors in the early Qing and were the ones who governed and administered China, stabilizing Qing rule. Han Chinese Bannermen dominated governor-general posts in the time of the Shunzhi and Kangxi emperors, as well as governor posts, largely excluding ordinary Han Chinese civilians. Three Liaodong Han Chinese Bannermen officers who played a major role in southern China from the Ming were Shang Kexi, Geng Zhongming, and Kong Youde. They governed southern China autonomously as viceroys for the Qing. The Qing deliberately avoided placing Manchus or Mongols as provincial governors and governors-general, with not a single Manchu governor until 1658, and not a single governor-general until 1668.

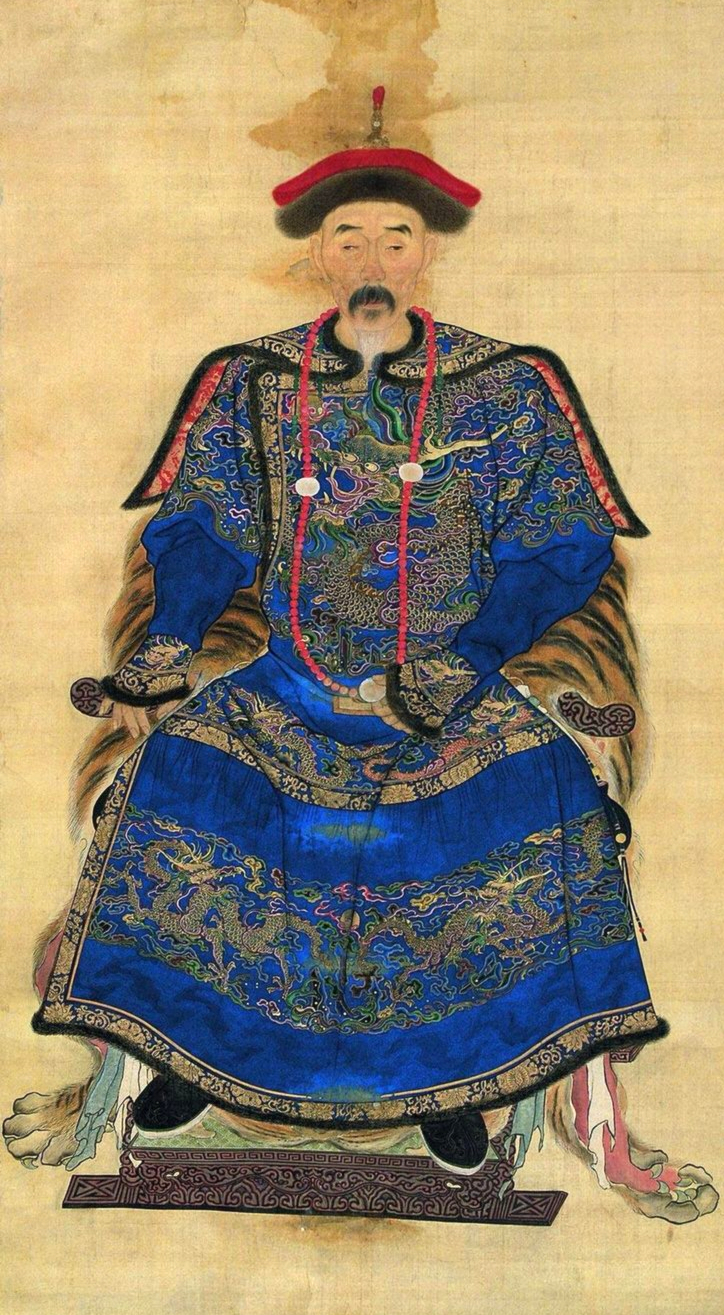
A portrait of Hong Chengchou (1593–1665), a former Ming official who advised Dorgon to take advantage of the violent death of the Ming Chongzhen Emperor to present the Qing as the avengers of the Ming and to conquer all of China instead of raiding for loot and slaves.

In addition to Han Chinese Banners, the Qing relied on the Green Standard Army, composed of Han Chinese (Ming) military forces who defected to the Qing, in order to help rule northern China. It was these troops who provided day-to-day military governance in China, and supplied the forces used in the front-line fighting. Han Chinese Bannermen, Mongol Bannermen, and Manchu Bannermen were only deployed to respond to emergency situations where there was sustained military resistance.

It was such a Qing army composed mostly of Han Chinese Bannermen which attacked Koxinga's Ming loyalists in Nanjing. The Manchus sent Han Chinese Bannermen to fight against Koxinga's Ming loyalists in Fujian. The Qing carried out a massive depopulation policy and clearances, forcing people to evacuate the coast in order to deprive Koxinga's Ming loyalists of resources: this led to a myth that it was because Manchus were "afraid of water". In fact, in Guangdong and Fujian, it was Han Bannermen who were the ones carrying out the fighting and killing for the Qing and this disproves the claim that "fear of water" on part of the Manchus had to do with the coastal evacuation to move inland and declare the sea ban. Most of the coastal population of Fujian fled to the hills or to Taiwan to avoid the war; Fuzhou was an empty city when the Qing forces entered it.

=== Consolidation in the north (1645) ===
Soon after entering Beijing in June 1644, Dorgon despatched Wu Sangui and his troops to pursue Li Zicheng, the rebel leader who had driven the last Ming emperor to suicide, but had been defeated by the Qing in late May at the Battle of Shanhai Pass. Wu managed to engage Li's rearguard many times, but Li still managed to cross the Gu Pass into Shanxi, and Wu returned to Beijing. Li Zicheng reestablished his power base in Xi'an (Shaanxi province), where he had declared the foundation of his Shun dynasty back in February 1644. In October of that year Dorgon sent several armies to root out Li Zicheng from his Shaanxi stronghold, after repressing revolts against Qing rule in Hebei and Shandong in the summer and autumn of 1644. Qing armies led by Ajige, Dodo, and Shi Tingzhu won consecutive engagements against Shun forces in Shanxi and Shaanxi, forcing Li Zicheng to leave his Xi'an headquarters in February 1645. Pursued by Ajige, Li retreated down the Han River into Wuchang, Hubei, and further to Tongcheng and the Jiugong Mountains until he was killed in September 1645, either by his own hand or by a peasant group that had organized for self-defense in this time of rampant banditry.

Between Beijing and Datong and in Shanxi province millenarianist groups of martial artist acolytes calling themselves the "Supreme Heaven's Clear and Pure Good Friends" and the "Society of Good Friends" respectively rose up in rebellion in 1645 against the new regime. These were suppressed by slaughtering anyone suspected of membership in such popular sects.

Other sectarian millenarian movements in Shanxi province broke out in rebellion in 1646–1648. Court fears of insurrection led them to crackdown on the sects led by Zheng Dengqi, which in turn caused a major rebellion. The rebels were pacified through generous grants of amnesty.

=== Administrative policies ===
On the orders of Nurhaci in 1629, a number of Chinese works considered to be of critical importance were translated into Manchu by Dahai. The first works translated were all Chinese military texts dedicated to the arts of war due to the Manchu interests in the topic. They were the Liutao, Su Shu (素書), and Sanlüe followed by the military text Wuzi and The Art of War.

Other texts translated into Manchu by Dahai included the Ming penal code. The Manchus placed great significance on Chinese texts relating to military affairs and governance, and further Chinese texts of history, law and military theory were translated into Manchu during the rule of Hong Taiji in Mukden. A Manchu translation was made of the military themed Chinese novel Romance of the Three Kingdoms. As well as the translations by Dahai, other Chinese literature, military theory and legal texts were translated into Manchu by Erdeni.

In order to pacify the population, the Qing authorities placed care to appoint good local officials. These were mainly ex-Ming non-Bannermen local magistrates who collaborated; virtually all county-level posts were filled by non-banner Han Chinese, who outnumbered Bannermen officials 12-to-1. There were in fact so many collaborators that the Qing court had to cut down on their numbers. The court also placed great attention to clamping down on administrative corruption through intensified inspections, and implemented a system of bureaucratic review (kao cheng). This helped to improve local government operations.

The Qing regime passed the Neighbourhood Security Investigation Law (linbao jiancha fa) which organised households into "mutual responsibility" groups of 10 and 100, and appointing leaders who were responsible for arresting fugitives. It was also used, initially at least, to stop the populace from moving in restive zones, and to stop arms and horse trading. From 1648 to 1649 civilian arms and horses were seized outright, but afterwards these were allowed for approved households in mutual responsibility units.

=== Conquest of the northwest (1644–1649) ===
The Monguors, who were tusi appointed by the Ming emperor, supported the Ming against a Tibetan revolt and against Li Zicheng's rebels in 1642. They were unable to resist Li Zicheng and many tusi chiefs were massacred. When the Qing forces under Ajige and Meng Qiaofang fought against Li's forces after 1644 they quickly joined the Qing side. Meanwhile, Ming loyalist forces numbering 70,000 well-equipped troops were coalescing in the mountains south of Xi'an, under former Ming commanders Sun Shoufa, He Zhen, and Wu Dading, capturing the city of Fengxiang. As they advanced toward Xi'an they were flanked by recent Ming defectors under Meng Qiaofang, and overrun with Bannermen. He Zhen's rebels were mainly bandits, and they continued operating out of small stockades in the forested, mountainous regions with 10 to 15 rebel families in every stockade, usually centered around a temple. They generally enjoyed popular support, and would retreat to the higher mountain safehouses upon receiving locals' notice of any military movements in the area. Groups of stockades congregated around a "King", who would grant commissions of Colonel or Major to other stockade leaders. They were finally pacified by forces led by Ren Zhen.

Late in 1646, forces assembled by a Muslim leader known in Chinese sources as Milayin (米喇印) revolted against Qing rule in Ganzhou (Gansu). He was soon joined by another Muslim named Ding Guodong (丁國棟). Proclaiming that they wanted to restore the fallen Ming, they occupied a number of towns in Gansu, including the provincial capital Lanzhou. These rebels' willingness to collaborate with non-Muslim Chinese suggests that they were not only driven by religion, and were not aiming to create an Islamic state. To pacify the rebels, the Qing government quickly despatched Meng Qiaofang, governor of Shaanxi, a former Ming official who had surrendered to the Qing in 1631. The rebel leaders persuaded Zhu Shichuan, Ming Prince of Yanchang, to legitimise them as a Ming loyalist force, and they quickly captured Ganzhou and Liangzhou, but were repelled at Gongchang, Gansu. Milayin and Ding Guodong negotiated a truce in which they would become Qing commanders in April 1649, but less than four weeks later they rose up in revolt again. Milayan was swiftly killed when he attempted to break out of the Qing encirclement, while Ding Guodong holed up for a siege in Suzhou and allied with the Kumul Khanate by inviting Prince Sa'id Baba to rule in Suzhou. The Qing counterattack was interrupted by the Jiang Xiang mutiny (below).

== Fall of the south ==
=== Conquest of Jiangnan (1645) ===
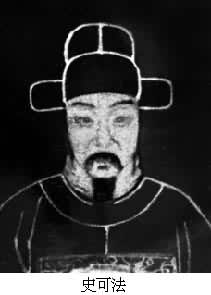
Portrait of Shi Kefa, who refused to surrender to the Qing in the defense of Yangzhou

A few weeks after the Chongzhen Emperor committed suicide in Beijing in April 1644, descendants of the Ming imperial house started arriving in Nanjing, which had been the auxiliary capital of the Ming dynasty. Agreeing that the Ming needed an imperial figure to rally support in the south, the Nanjing Minister of War Shi Kefa and the Fengyang Governor-general Ma Shiying agreed to form a loyalist Ming government around the Prince of Fu, Zhu Yousong, a first cousin of the Chongzhen Emperor who had been next in line for succession after the dead emperor's sons, whose fates were still unknown. The Prince was crowned as emperor on 19 June 1644 under the protection of Ma Shiying and his large war fleet. He would reign under the era name "Hongguang" (弘光). The Hongguang regime was ridden with factional bickering that facilitated the Qing conquest of Jiangnan, which was launched from Xi'an in April 1645. (Note: Dorgon's brother Dodo, who led the Qing army, received "the imperial command to conduct a southern expedition" (南征; nan zheng) on 1 April 1645.) He set out from Xi'an on that very day. (Note: For examples of the factional struggles that weakened the Hongguang court, see Wakeman 1985, pp. 523–543.) Greatly aided by the surrender of Southern Ming commanders Li Chengdong and Liu Liangzuo, the Qing army took the key city of Xuzhou north of the Huai River in early May 1645, leaving Shi Kefa in Yangzhou as the main defender of the Southern Ming's northern frontiers. The betrayal of these commanders handed over the entire northwestern zone of the Southern Ming, helping the Qing forces to link up. Ming loyalist Ma Shiying had brought to Nanjing troops from the western provinces made out of non-Han Chinese indigenous fierce tribal warriors called "Sichuan" soldiers to defend the city against the Qing. These Ming loyalist non-Han Chinese "barbarian" fierce tribal warriors were slaughtered by the Han Chinese citizens of Nanjing after the Han Chinese people of Nanjing had peacefully defected and turned the city to Qing rule when the Southern Ming Hongguang Emperor left the city. The people also yelled "These are the son and daughter-in-law of the traitorous minister Ma Shiying!" when they paraded the daughter-in-law and son of Ma Shiying after storming Ruan Dacheng and Ma Shiying's houses and they also did it to Wang Duo's daughter-in-law and son. The Dutch East India Company secretary Johann Nieuhof observed that Nanjing city and its people were unharmed by the Qing and only the Ming palace suffered destruction. The damage inflicted to the Ming palace was largely done by the Han Chinese locals of Nanjing, and not the Qing army.

Qing Prince of Yu, Dodo, later berated the Southern Ming Prince of Fu, Zhu Yousong, over his battle strategy in 1645, telling him that the Southern Ming would have defeated the Qing if only the Southern Ming assaulted the Qing military before they forded the Yellow River instead of tarrying. The Prince of Fu could find no words to respond when he tried to defend himself.

In Jiangnan, the Qing implemented peaceful takeovers for districts and cities who surrendered without any violent resistance, leaving the local Ming officials who defected in charge and the Qing Han Chinese-Manchu army would not attack them nor kill or do any violence against peaceful defectors.

Several contingents of Qing forces converged on Yangzhou on 13 May 1645. The majority of the Qing army which marched on the city were Ming defectors and they far outnumbered the Manchus and Bannermen. Shi Kefa's small force refused to surrender, but could not resist Dodo's artillery: on 20 May Qing cannon wielded by the Han Chinese Bannermen (Ujen Coohai) breached the city wall and Dodo ordered the "brutal slaughter" of Yangzhou's entire population to terrorize other Jiangnan cities into surrendering to the Qing. On 1 June Qing armies crossed the Yangzi River and easily took the garrison city of Zhenjiang, which protected access to Nanjing. The Qing arrived at the gates of Nanjing a week later, but the Hongguang Emperor had already fled. The city surrendered without a fight on 16 June 1645 after its last defenders had made Dodo promise he would not hurt the population. Within less than a month, the Qing had captured the fleeing Ming emperor (he died in Beijing the following year) and seized Jiangnan's main cities, including Suzhou and Hangzhou. By then the frontier between the Qing and the Southern Ming had been pushed south to the Qiantang River. Nieuhof observed that the city of Nanjing was unharmed by Qing soldiers.

Qing soldiers ransomed women captured from Yangzhou back to their original husbands and fathers in Nanjing after Nanjing peacefully surrendered, corralling the women into the city and whipping them hard with their hair containing a tag showing the price of the ransom, which was cheap at only 3 to 4 taels for the best and 10 taels at most for those wearing good clothing.

During the factional struggles, the warlord Zuo Liangyu had mutinied against Ma Shiying who was in control at Nanjing, accusing him of repression. With the arrival of the Qing forces in Jiujiang, almost the entire army of Zuo Liangyu defected to the Qing. This provided the Qing with a critical new pool of military leaders and troops. These were also officers from Liaodong, or had previously served there, who in the 1630s had been withdrawn to fight rebels in the interior provinces. The most important of these was Jin Shenghuan who was later single-handedly responsible for the conquest of Jiangxi. Other generals were Zuo Liangyu's son Zuo Menggeng who later crushed rebels in Datong, Lu Guangzu and Li Guoying who served in the Sichuan campaign, Xu Yong and Hao Xiaozhong who served in the Hunan campaigns. Many of these became the most capable commanders against the Southern Ming loyalists.

The Hongguang Emperor fled into Anhui on the Yangzi's southern bank at Tongling, in Huang Degong's military camp. Huang Degong told him that if he died fighting to the death in Nanjing then all the ministers would have followed his lead in fighting against the Qing, but now that he fled without a fight and listened to traitors his small army could not act as a guard for the emperor. Huang Degong then said "I am willing to devote my life to you" after the emperor said he could not rely on him as a minister resentfully. Then a group of Qing Han Chinese and Banner soldiers showed up to Huang Degong's camp in Wuhu on 15 June 1645, under Zhang Tianlu, the Guazhou garrison commander, bannermen from Dodo and general Liu Liangzuo. Huang Degong rejected their demand to turn over the Hongguang Emperor but Zhang Tianlu then shot an arrow into Huang's throat and killed him. Tian Xiong and Ma Deong, the brigade commanders under Huang Degong then defected to the Qing and gave general Liu Liangzuo the Hongguang Emperor.

=== Queue order and Jiangnan resistance (1645–1646) ===
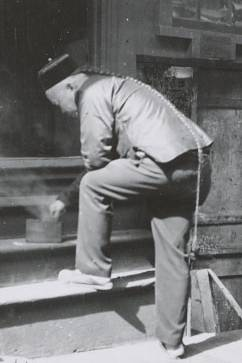
A Chinese man in San Francisco's Chinatown around 1900. The Chinese habit of wearing a queue came from Dorgon's July 1645 edict ordering all men to shave their forehead and tie their hair into a queue like the Manchus.

Resistance in the region was originally muted. As the heartland of the scholarly class, hundreds of Jiangnan scholars committed suicide by drowning, hanging, self-immolation, or hunger strike on the news of the death of the Hongguang Emperor, sometimes entire families. Those who did not collaborate or commit suicide would have to join with bandits to resist the new regime. With the news of the fall of the capital back in 1644 and skyrocketing food prices, poor peasants had revolted against the local elite and indentured servitude, arguing that "master and servant should address each other as brothers". They ransacked the villas and forced the wealthy to flee to the cities. Although the Southern Ming regime managed to restore order, the discontent persisted and coalesced as the Black Dragon Society, which immediately resumed their revolt once the Qing crushed the Southern Ming forces. Some of the gentry, associated with the Donglin movement, resisted compromise, but most gentry and urban elites proceeded to collaborate with the Qing in order to acquire their help to suppress the revolt or other threats such as bandits. However, with the introduction of the queue order, anti-Qing resistance exploded once more.

On 21 July 1645, after the Jiangnan region had been superficially pacified, Dorgon issued "the most untimely promulgation of his career": he ordered all Chinese men to shave their forehead and to braid the rest of their hair into a queue just like the Manchus. The punishment for non-compliance was death. In the queue order edict, Dorgon specifically emphasized the fact that Manchus and the Qing emperor himself all wore the queue and shaved their foreheads so that by following the queue order and shaving, Han Chinese would look like Manchus and the Qing Emperor, and invoked the Confucian notion that the people were like the sons of the emperor who was like the father, so the father and sons could not look different and to decrease differences in physical appearance between Manchus and Han Chinese.

The queue order was proposed by a number of Han Chinese officials in order to curry favour with Dorgon. Nanjing civilian official Zhang Sunzhen remarked that he had a portrait of his ancestors wearing Manchu clothes because his family was Tartar. Therefore, he considered it appropriate to shave his head into the Manchu hairstyle. This policy of symbolic submission to the new dynasty helped the Manchus in telling friend from foe. (Note: "From the Manchus' perspective, the command to cut one's hair or lose one's head not only brought rulers and subjects together into a single physical resemblance; it also provided them with a perfect loyalty test.") However, for Han Chinese officials and literati, the new hairstyle was "a humiliating act of degradation" (because it breached a common Confucian directive to preserve one's body intact), whereas for common folk cutting their hair "was tantamount to the loss of their manhood." (Note: In the Classic of Filial Piety, Confucius is cited to say that "a person's body and hair, being gifts from one's parents, are not to be damaged: this is the beginning of filial piety" (身體髮膚，受之父母，不敢毀傷，孝之始也). Prior to the Qing dynasty, adult Han Chinese men customarily did not cut their hair, but instead wore it in the form of a top-knot.) Because it united Chinese of all social backgrounds into resistance against Qing rule, the hair-cutting command "broke the momentum of the Qing [expansion]." (Note: "The hair-cutting order, more than any other act, engendered the Kiangnan [Jiangnan] resistance of 1645. The rulers' effort to make Manchus and Han one unified 'body' initially had the effect of unifying upper- and lower-class natives in central and south China against the interlopers.")

A minor scholar Wang Zhan, in command of rural militia, besieged Taicang. In Xiushui, the local military commander Chen Wu and the local gentry mobilised militia and revolted, but they failed in an attack on Jiaxing. In Kunshan, the resistance forces under magistrate Yang Yongyan, general Wang Zuocai and scholar Zhu Jihuang had been mostly unsuccessful until the queue order was passed, when they experienced a surge in popular support and succeeded in killing the local collaborationist magistrate. However the army of Prince Dodo turned on the region and with the exception of a few holdouts such as Jiangyin, the loyalists fell quickly and the population was massacred.

Resistance from marsh bandits, fishermen, gentry-led militia and ex-Ming soldiers coalesced around Lake Tai. The region's bandits were infamous for kidnapping rich people and threatening to blind or bury them alive unless ransom was paid, while distributing food and money to the poor. Now their river craft were converted into an ad hoc naval raiding force and joined forces with their former gentry enemies. The gentry united these elements into the "White Headed Army" since they wore white turbans. East of the lake, loyalist gentry in Songjiang District under Chen Zilong and the remaining Ming navy at Chongming Island under Wu Zhikui coordinated to rise up and cut off the Qing forces in Zhejiang. The loyalists aimed to serve as a linkage between the upstream resistance in Hunan and the coastal resistance in Zhejiang and Fujian. The loyalists splintered over strategy disagreements. The loyalist navy, trying to sail for Lake Mao, was destroyed at Chushenpu by general Li Chengdong's light craft forces. The Lake Tai resistance stormed Suzhou but were trapped in the city when Qing forces under Wang Guocai regrouped and closed the gates. Songjiang fell after being deceived into opening the gates by Qing forces covering up their shaved heads. A group of loyalists fled to join the resistance in Fuzhou.

The defiant population of Jiading and Songjiang was massacred by former Ming northern Chinese general Li Chengdong, respectively on 24 August and 22 September. Jiangyin also held out against about 10,000 Qing troops for 83 days. When the city wall was finally breached on 9 October 1645, the Qing army led by northern Chinese Ming defector Liu Liangzuo, who had been ordered to "fill the city with corpses before you sheathe your swords," massacred the entire population, killing between 74,000 and 100,000 people. Hundreds of thousands of people were killed before all of China was brought into compliance. Although Manchu Bannermen were often associated with the Jiangyin Massacre which targeted the Ming loyalists, the majority of those who had participated in Jiangyin Massacre were Han Chinese Bannermen. Ming defector Li Chengdong's Han Chinese soldiers, who were mostly former revolted refugees, peasants and bandits from the north called the Han Chinese anti-queue resisters and Ming loyalists in Jiading "southern barbarians" (manzi) threatening them, telling them "southern barbarian, hand over your valuables", raping, torturing and massacring. When the Qing imposed the Queue Order in China, many Han Chinese defectors were appointed in the massacre of dissidents. Li Chengdong oversaw three massacres in Jiading that occurred within the same month; together which resulted in tens of thousands of deaths and left cities depopulated.

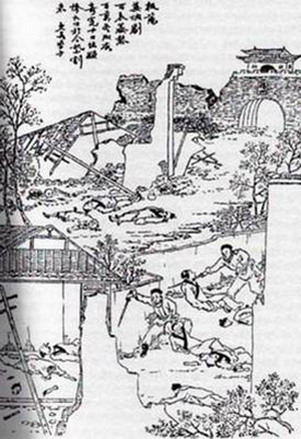
A late Qing artist's conception of the Yangzhou massacre

In Fuzhou, although former-Ming subjects were initially compensated with silver for complying to the Queue Order, the defected southern Chinese general Hong Chengchou had enforced the policy thoroughly on the residents of Jiangnan by 1645. The Han Chinese Banners were repeatedly assigned to enforce the Queue Order, often resulting in massacres such as the Yangzhou Massacre, during which local residents were seen harassed by troops.

Chongming Island in the Yangtzi estuary continued to harbour pirates and resistance forces, threatening to link up with the resistance in Anqing and Hubei-Hunan. The Qing authorities were only able to maintain control through working with corrupt former Ming officials such as Qian Qianyi and Ruan Dacheng. Loyalist marines continued fighting in the Lake Tai area, under Wu Yi and Zhou Rui, mainly local fishermen and smugglers, which posed a problem for Qing forces who lacked competent sailors. These linked up gentry resistance all over the region, dealing severe losses on Qing forces of governor Tu Guobao. Wu Yi attempted to link up with Southern Ming resistance in Zhejiang by entering negotiations with the Qing official of Jiashan, but this was a trap; he was captured and executed. Resistance still carried on as the gentry continued near-open protest. In 1645, in Liyang the poor peasants revolted, around Tangshan a scholar led a rebellion of local bandits, and from Mount Yuntai to Haizhou (Lianyungang) an insurgency was led by the Ming Prince of Xinchang. Ming Prince of Rui'an and Prince of Ruichang mobilised rebels in the Huai'an-Yangzhou area and around Nanjing for an assault on Nanjing in September 1646, but the Qing collaborators discovered the plan and defeated it.

=== Sichuan campaign (1646–1658) ===
In early 1646 Dorgon sent two expeditions to Sichuan to try to destroy Zhang Xianzhong's Great Xi dynasty regime: the first expedition did not reach Sichuan because it was caught up against remnants; the second one, under the direction of Hooge (the son of Hong Taiji who had lost the succession struggle of 1643) reached Sichuan in October 1646. Hearing that a Qing army led by a major general was approaching, Zhang Xianzhong fled toward Shaanxi, splitting his troops into four divisions that were ordered to act independently if something were to happen to him. Before leaving, he ordered a massacre of the population of his capital Chengdu.

The Qing forces advanced from Xi'an into Sichuan. Fearing Zhang's murderous tendencies, and with his Sichuanese troops unwilling to carry out Zhang's massacres on their fellow provincials, Zhang's commander Liu Jinzhong defected to the Qing and guided them to Zhang. Liu was later granted the title of Baron.

En route Zhang Xianzhong was surprised by a Qing army under Hooge and Li Guoying at Mount Fenghuang, after being betrayed by one of his officers. Refusing to believe the scout's report, he rode out to see for himself and was killed by an arrow. This was witnessed by Jesuit missionary Gabriel de Magalhães, who reported it. Zhang Xianzhong was killed in a battle against Qing forces near Xichong in central Sichuan on 1 February 1647. In one account, he was betrayed by one of his officers, Liu Jinzhong, who pointed him out to be shot by an archer. Hooge then easily took Chengdu, but found it in a state of desolation he had not expected. Unable to find food in the countryside, his soldiers looted the area, killing resisters, and even resorted to cannibalism as food shortages grew acute.

Sun Kewang informally took over leadership, and he moved southward. In Chongqing, the Ming general Zeng Ying still held out. Xi dynasty boats under Liu Wenxiu attacked Zeng's command boat on the Yangtzi River, killed him and took the city, but continued moving southward to Guizhou. A young son of Zhang Xianzhong was supposed to be enthroned as the next ruler but he died on the journey. The remnants of the Ming force moved eastward to Fuling District and Yunyang County under Li Zhanchun and Yu Dahai. The remaining Ming forces under Yang Zhan, now promoted to Marquis and Ming commander of Sichuan, moved south towards Guizhou and unsuccessfully attempted to contact the Southern Ming court for supplies, wandering in desperate search for supplies to Jiading. Here he began stockpiling resources to prepare for war against the Qing. Qing forces mainly left the province due to starvation and the remainder garrisoned at Baoning in the north under Li Guoying, who moved to crush banditry, called for supplies to be shipped in and recultivated the land to relieve the famine-like conditions. After he was attacked and defeated by Li Zhanchun and Yu Dahai in 1647 in a land-riverine battle at Zhangzhou, he started building a riverine force of his own. The Yongli Emperor in Guangdong sent his alleged distant relative Zhu Rongfan to organise the Ming forces in Sichuan who instead became yet another warlord, establishing himself as a "Prince of Chu" at Kuizhou. These groups started fighting among each other, which helped the Qing secure the northern and western parts of the province by 1652, and the rest of the province by 1658.

Anti-Qing forces including Great Shun and Zhang Xianzhong loyalists remained active in the mountainous regions between Chongqing and Hubei. Forces led by Li Laiheng, a nephew of Li Zicheng, established a base in the Maolu Mountain of Xingshan County from 1653. They were known as the Kuidong Thirteen Families and managed to hold out until suppressed by a large-scale Qing campaign in 1664.

=== Jiangxi and Fujian campaigns (1646–1650) ===
Qing conquest of Southern Ming territories

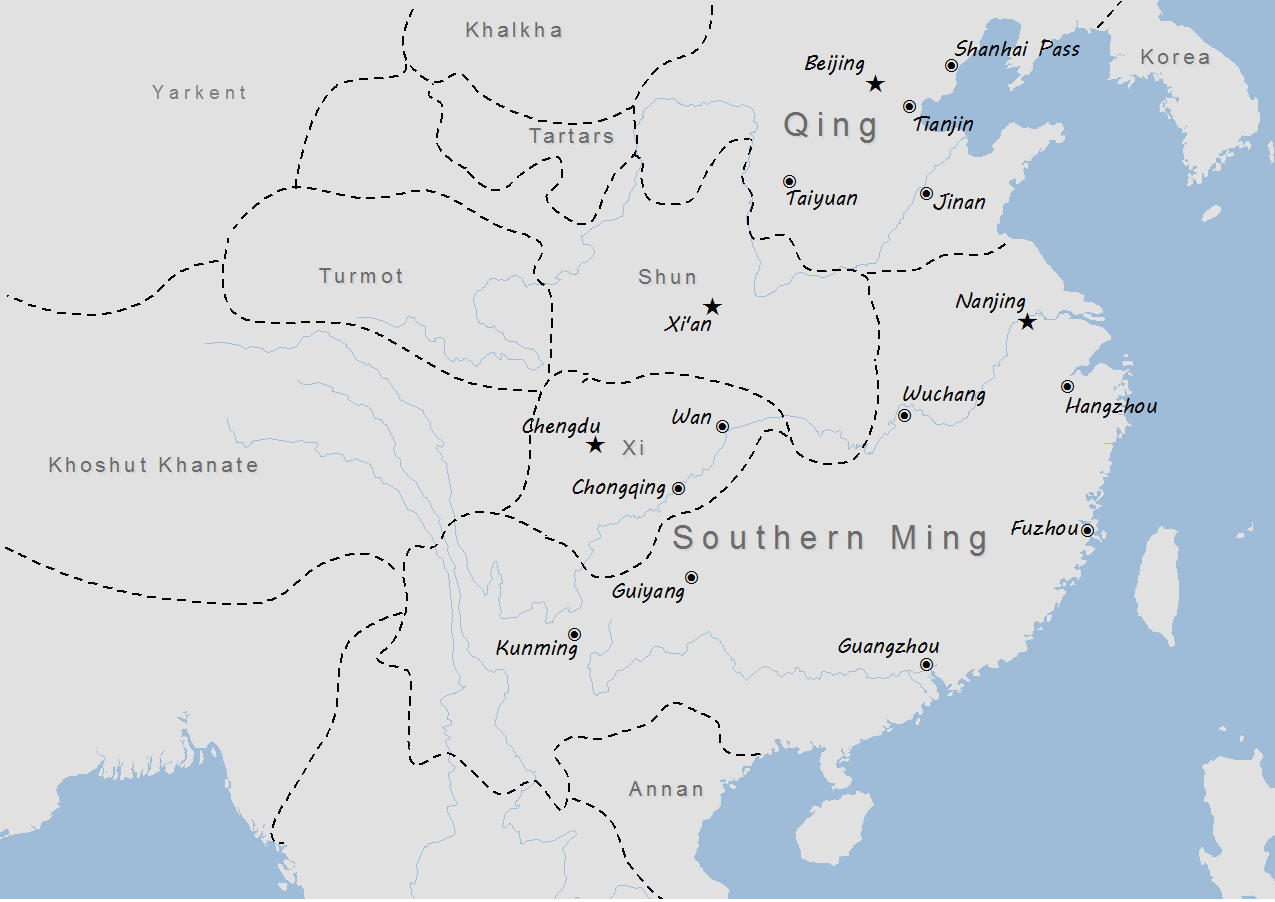
Situation of Southern Ming

The Qing advance into Zhejiang province was aided by the collaboration of Tong Guoqi, who was appointed Governor of Zhejiang and Fujian. Tong was originally from Liaodong, but lived in Zhejiang where he came into contact with Chinese Catholic scholars who, claiming that Europe was an ideal society and that all nations shared one morality, argued that Chinese culture was too inward-looking and called for appreciation and imitation of foreign nations, and cooperation with them, whether Europeans or Manchus. This group therefore supported Manchu rule.

Meanwhile, the Southern Ming had not been eliminated. When Hangzhou fell to the Qing on 6 July 1645, the Prince of Tang Zhu Yujian, a ninth-generation descendant of Ming founder Zhu Yuanzhang, managed to escape by land to the southeastern province of Fujian. Crowned as the Longwu Emperor in the coastal city of Fuzhou on 18 August, he depended on the protection of talented seafarer Zheng Zhilong (also known as "Nicholas Iquan"). The childless emperor adopted Zheng's eldest son and granted him the imperial surname. "Koxinga", as his son is known to Westerners; it is a distortion of the title "Lord of the Imperial Surname" (國姓爺; Guoxingye). Upon Zheng Zhilong's request, the Tokugawa Shogunate in Japan quietly supported the Zheng clan's pro-Ming forces by quietly granting them access to mercenaries, weapons and other strategic materials. Zheng Zhilong drafted a plan entitled "Grand Strategy for ordering the country", in which he argued for the Southern Ming to reconquer territory through regional military commanders rather than a centralized fashion. This brought him at loggerheads with the Longwu Emperor. Famine also struck after drought and crops failed all along the southeastern coastal region, while Qing attacks on the Yangzi river delta had cut access to raw silk. In response, the Longwu emperor wanted to reconquer Huguang and Jiangxi provinces which were major producers of rice to help boost the southern Ming, but Zheng Zhilong refused to expand out of Fujian for fear of losing control of the regime.

In the meantime, another Ming claimant, the Prince of Lu Zhu Yihai, had named himself regent in Zhejiang, but the two loyalist regimes failed to cooperate, making their chances of success even lower than they already were.

In February 1646, Qing armies seized land west of the Qiantang River from the Lu regime and defeated a ragtag force representing the Longwu Emperor in northeastern Jiangxi. In May, they besieged Ganzhou, the last Ming bastion in Jiangxi. In July, a new southern campaign led by Prince Bolo sent Prince of Lu's Zhejiang regime into disarray and proceeded to attack the Longwu regime in Fujian. Hoping to gain rewards from Prince Bolo, Zheng Zhilong betrayed the loyalists by contacting Hong Chengchou and left northern Fujian undefended against a Qing army led by Li Chengdong and Tong Yangjia. The Qing took control of Fujian in 1645.

On the pretext of relieving the siege of Ganzhou, the Longwu court left their Fujian base in late September 1646, but the Qing army caught up with them. Longwu and his empress were summarily executed in Tingzhou (western Fujian) on 6 October 1646. After the fall of Fuzhou on 17 October, Zheng Zhilong surrendered to the Qing and his son Koxinga fled to the island of Taiwan with his fleet. When news arrived of the Longwu emperor's demise, the fortress of Ganzhou in southern Jiangxi under the command of Yang Tinglin also caved in to Qing general Jin Shenghuan by November 1646.

The Prince-Regent of Lu, with the aid of the sea-lord Zhang Mingzhen, continued resistance at sea on the island of Shacheng, between Zhejiang and Fujian. By July 1649 their base of operations shifted northward to Jiantiaosuo. After killing a rival naval commander Huang Binqing, the base was moved to Zhoushan in November. From there he attempted to raise a rebellion in Jiangnan, but Zhoushan fell to the Qing in 1651 after being betrayed by Huang Binqing's former officers. Zhang Mingzhen, with all his family, fled to join Zheng Chenggong in Xiamen.

=== Hunan, Guangdong, and Guangxi campaign (1645–1650) ===
After the fall of Nanjing, the old Ming governor of Huguang (Hubei and Hunan) He Tengjiao, under the Longwu court, established the Thirteen Defense Commands (zhen) with Shun remnants in Hunan, which became famous for holding out against the Qing. Qing forces under the early defector Kong Youde subdued Hunan in 1646. After the fall of the Longwu regime, He Tengjiao swore allegiance to the Yongli Emperor, continuing resistance in Hunan and Guizhou provinces, and was finally killed at Xiangtan in 1649.

The Longwu Emperor's younger brother Zhu Yuyue, who had fled Fuzhou by sea, soon founded another Ming regime in Guangzhou, the capital of Guangdong province, taking the reign title Shaowu (紹武) on 11 December 1646. Short of official costumes, the court had to purchase robes from local theater troops. On 24 December, Prince of Gui Zhu Youlang established the Yongli (永曆) regime in the same vicinity. The Prince of Gui had fled from Zhang Xianzhong's attack on Hubei/Hunan to Zhaoqing in Guangdong, but his retreat to Guangxi led other loyalists to believe that he had abandoned them and they proceeded to enthrone the Shaowu emperor. The situation was complicated by the fact that the Shaowu court mainly consisted of local Cantonese while the Yongli court consisted of men of other provinces.

The two Ming regimes fought each other until 20 January 1647, when a small Qing force led by former Southern Ming commander Li Chengdong captured Guangzhou, killing the Shaowu Emperor and sending the Yongli Emperor fleeing to Nanning in Guangxi.

In May 1648, however, Li Chengdong, disappointed at being made a mere regional commander after taking Guangdong province, mutinied against the Qing and rejoined the Ming. The reversion of another dissatisfied Ming defector in Jiangxi, Jin Shenghuan, who was also discontented at being appointed a regional commander after conquering Jiangxi province, helped the Yongli regime to retake most of southern China.

The Yongli emperor was encouraged by these developments and saw hope in a Ming reconquest, likening it to the revival of the Han and Tang dynasties after the usurpations of Wang Mang and An Lushan. Loyalists hoped to move the emperor to Wuchang where he would lead a reconquest of Nanjing and Kaifeng. However, the Qing commander Xu Yong (one of those who defected at Jiangnan) repelled the loyalist counterattack at Changsha as the populace did not side with the loyalists, and Qing forces advanced again. Xu Yong was later present at the capture of He Tengjiao in Xiangtan, and his army absorbed He's remaining troops.

This resurgence of loyalist hopes was short-lived. New Han-Manchu-Mongol armies under Kong Youde, Jirgalang and Lekedehun managed to reconquer the central province of Huguang (present-day Hubei and Hunan) in 1649, and the population of Xiangtan was massacred. Jiangxi fell to another army led by Tantai, Holhoi, Shang Kexi and Geng Zhongming. Guangdong fell to Shang Kexi in November 1650. The Yongli Emperor fled to Nanning and from there to Guizhou. Finally on 24 November 1650, Qing forces led by Shang Kexi captured Guangzhou with 74 of his own cannons and the aid of Dutch gunners, and massacred the city's population, killing as many as 70,000 people. In Guangzhou, massacres of Ming loyalists and civilians in 1650 were carried out by Qing forces under the command of northern Han Chinese Banner generals Shang Kexi and Geng Jimao.

== Ming loyalist revolts in the north (1647–1654) ==
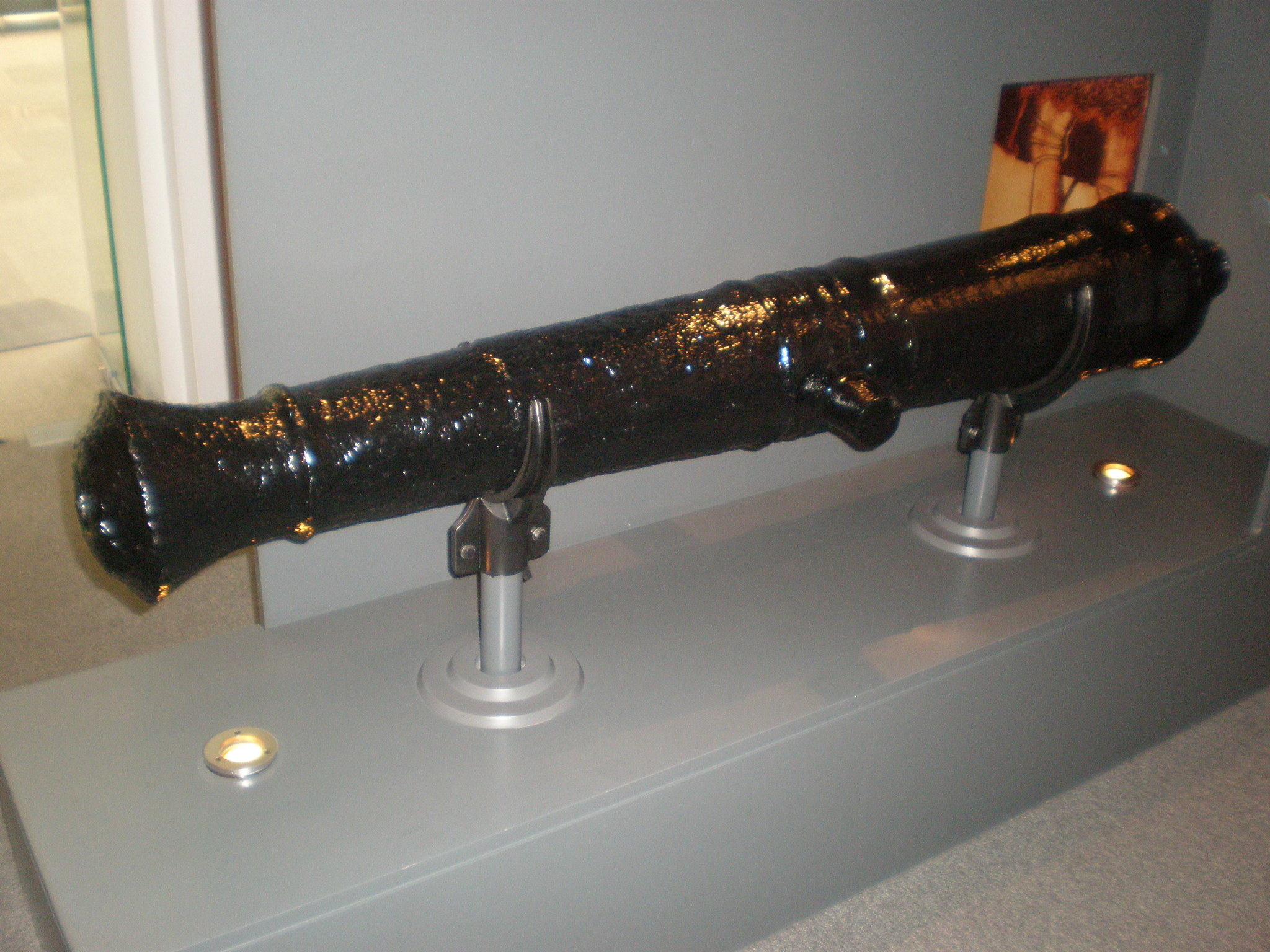
A cannon cast in 1650 by the Southern Ming, from the Hong Kong Museum of Coastal Defence

A major revolt around Zouping, Shandong broke out in March 1647. Shandong had been plagued by brigandage before the collapse of the Ming, and most Ming officials and their gentry-organised militia welcomed the new Qing regime, cooperating with them against the bandits who now grew into sizeable rebel armies complete with guns and cannons, and whose leaders had declared themselves "kings". These were held off by the local gentry, who organised the local population into a defence force.

In March 1648, a bandit chief, Yang Sihai, and a woman by the surname of Zhang claimed to be the Crown Prince of the Tianqi Emperor and his consort, respectively. With the aid of another bandit chief called Zhang Tianbao, they rebelled under the Ming flag in Qingyun, south of Tianjin. The Qing was forced to send in "heavy troops" (artillery), as well as extra reinforcements. The Qing succeeded in subduing the rebellion in 1649, but with heavy losses. Further south, in the forests between Shandong, Hebei, and Henan provinces, 20 Ming loyalist brigades of 1,000 men each were amassing. This force was known as the "Elm Garden Army", equipped with Western cannons. Commander Li Huajing had declared a distant relative of the Ming imperial family as the "Tianzheng Emperor", and besieged and captured the cities of Caozhou, Dingtao County, Chengwu County, and Dongming County, Lanyang and Fengqiu. Heavy casualties were inflicted on the Qing. Defected Ming general Gao Di led elite multi-ethnic Banner forces to crush the insurrection by 18 November.

In January 1649, Jiang Xiang, the military governor in Datong, Shanxi, felt threatened that Dorgon might be attempting to restrict his authority and rebelled, switching allegiance back to the Ming. Dorgon travelled to personally intervene against the rebels. The generals Liu Denglou, commander of Yulin, Shaanxi, and Wang Yongqiang, top commander in Yan'an, Shaanxi, contacted Jiang Xiang, rebelled and switched back to the Ming. They were joined by Mongol leader Zhamasu who rose up in the Helan Mountains. The revolt was defeated by the end of the year by a Banner force commanded by Prince Bolo and Wu Sangui. The Ming loyalist-held city of Puzhou was subject to a massacre. Simultaneously, Zhu Senfu, a man who claimed to be related to the Ming Imperial family, declared himself Prince of Qin in Jiezhou, Shaanxi, near Sichuan, backed by a local outlaw named Zhao Ronggui with an army of 10,000 men. The rebels were crushed by Wu Sangui's forces. In the chaos, many bandit groups expanded their raids. A local outlaw by the name of Zhang Wugui rose up in Shanxi and began handing out Ming ranks and documents, assembling an army. He attacked Wutai in 1649, but was driven off. He continued marauding the province until he was killed in February 1655 when his headquarters was discovered by a Manchu scout.

With the mutineers defeated, the Qing turned on the Muslim rebels of Ding Guodong at Suzhou, Gansu and crushed them with ease in December 1649. Ding Guodong was killed. The population was appeased by strengthening judicial protections and, at the suggestion of supervisory secretary He Bi, Muslim communities were disarmed and shifted 150 li (75 km) away from Han Chinese communities. The Jiayu Pass was blocked to sever all relations between the Kumul Khanate and the Gansu Muslims. By 1650 the Muslim rebels had been crushed in campaigns that inflicted heavy casualties.

The southeastern region of Shaanxi, a rural, untamed area, was beset by Ming colonel Tang Zhongheng, accompanied by Ming princes Zhu Changying and Zhu Youdu and a Ming Mongol commander, Shibulai. Other rebels, given the ready access to the Ming loyalists in neighbouring Sichuan, were able to continue resistance. Sun Shoujin, who called himself the Earl of Xing'an, with the aid of general Tan Qi, led an alliance of mountain fortresses around Mount Banchang, just south of Ziyang. They resisted an intense Banner assault with their long rifles, but Tan Qi abandoned Sun in July 1652, leading to Sun's defeat and death. A bandit gang, the "Pole bandits", who were plundering the local population, were also defeated shortly afterward by the betrayal of one of their two chiefs.

== Continued fighting in the south ==
=== Conquest of the southwest (1652–1661) ===
The flight of the Yongli Emperor—the last sovereign of the Southern Ming dynasty—from 1647 to 1661. The provincial and national boundaries are those of the People's Republic of China.

After the elimination of Zhang Xianzhong's Xi dynasty, his generals retreated southward to Guizhou province, where they encountered the Southern Ming forces retreating from Guangxi province. The Ming emperor, in urgent need of reinforcements, requested the aid of the Xi dynasty's followers. Zhang Xianzhong's former deputy, Sun Kewang, exterminated all his opponents in the Southern Ming court and kept the Ming emperor under de facto imprisonment, all the while continuing to refer to Zhang Xianzhong as a deceased emperor.

Yunnan was still a frontier land where tribal chieftains tusi were still in power in many areas. The tusi were led by the Mu family who held the position of Duke of Qianguo. In the early Ming, it was Duke Mu Sheng who led the Ming armies in Vietnam during the Ming-Ho War. Now the Mu family were still in power in Yunnan and remained loyal to the Ming. However, due to discontent against their rule, local revolts broke out against them. Mu joined with the few remaining Ming officials and Sun Kewang to restore order.

Though the Qing under Dorgon's leadership had successfully pushed the Southern Ming deep into southern China, Ming loyalism was not dead yet. In early August 1652, Li Dingguo, who had served as general in Sichuan under Zhang Xianzhong (d. 1647) and was now protecting the Yongli Emperor of the Southern Ming, retook Guilin (Guangxi province) from the Qing. Within a month, most of the commanders who had been supporting the Qing in Guangxi reverted to the Ming side. Despite occasionally successful military campaigns in Huguang and Guangdong in the next two years, Li Dingguo failed to retake important cities. In 1653, the Qing court put Hong Chengchou in charge of retaking the southwest. Headquartered in Changsha (in what is now Hunan province), he patiently built up his forces; only in late 1658 did well-fed and well-supplied Qing troops mount a multipronged campaign to take Guizhou and Yunnan. Infighting broke out between the forces of Li Dingguo and Sun Kewang. The Ming emperor, fearful that Sun intended to make himself emperor, asked Li Dingguo to liberate him. After Sun's forces were routed, he and his surviving troops defected to Hong Chengchou's Qing armies, giving the Qing their opening to strike.

The Manchus were not able to conquer southern China by their own accord; they only did so by delegating to Han Chinese. During the fighting to extinguish Ming loyalism in the south, the Shunzhi Emperor came to rely increasingly on Han Chinese bannermen, some second or even third generation, to fill governor and governor-general posts as a kind of "provincial janissaries". Virtually all posts were filled by professional military officers of the Han Chinese Banners rather than Manchus or Han Chinese civilians. Han Chinese bannermen were the main force that subdued southern China. This made the Qing extremely dependent on the private armies of the autonomous Han Chinese banner nobles. The reliance on Han Chinese was made obvious in 1660 when the emperor ruled in favour of Lu Guangxu, a Han Chinese provincial censor who delivered a report criticizing Manchu military corruption, destroying the Manchu claim that Han Chinese officials should not be involved in military matters. This change was a reflection of the actual military importance of Han Chinese in the dynasty, as well as the determination of the Qing rulers not to allow the Manchu and Han Chinese Bannermen class to dominate the government. Through this compromise, the bureaucracy versus military conflict that had helped to cause the downfall of the Ming dynasty was resolved.

=== Flight to Burma (1659–1662) ===
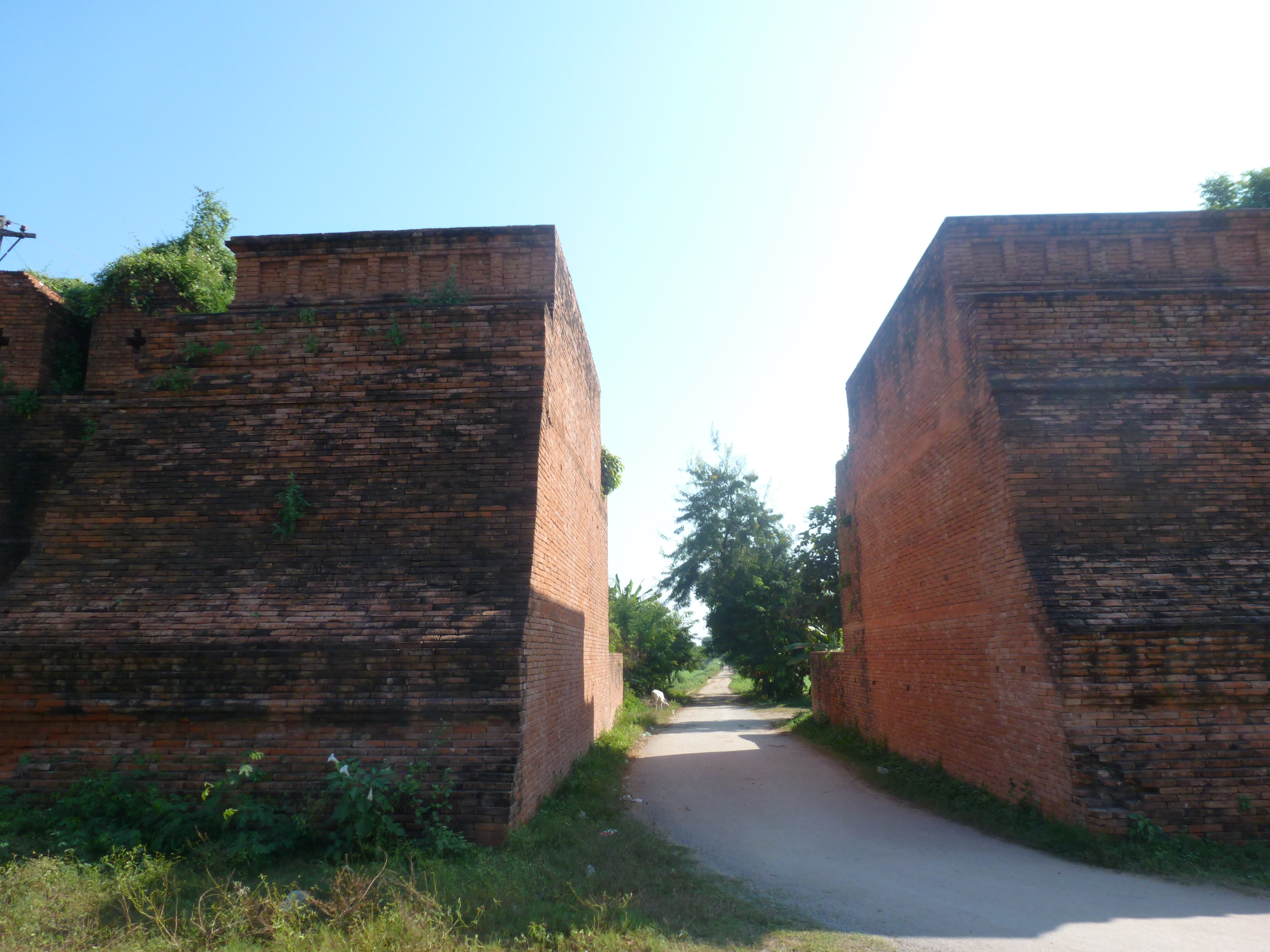
Remains of the outer walls of Ava

In late January 1659, a Qing army led by Manchu Prince Doni (1636–1661), Dodo's son, took the capital of Yunnan, sending the Yongli Emperor fleeing into nearby Burma, which was then ruled by King Pindale Min of the Toungoo dynasty. The imperial retinue was disarmed by the Burmese; many of the Ming retinue were killed or enslaved, and the remainder were housed in huts opposite the capital city Ava, under a Burmese guard. In Yunnan, the banner troops had engaged in pillage and rape when moving through Hmong lands, and the chieftain Nayan, under the promise of being given overall command of all the tusi chiefs, rose in rebellion on the side of the Yongli Emperor. His city of Yuanjiang was taken by Wu Sangui in 1659 amid a massacre of 100,000 people, and the next year was spent putting down the rest of the rebels. As the city fell Nayan bowed in the direction of the emperor and declared "Your minister has exerted himself to the utmost. I have nothing else to report to Your Highness." He then burned himself and his family.

Loyalist generals Li Dingguo and Bai Wenxuan attempted to rescue the emperor from the Burmese and attacked Ava between 1660 and 1661. They opened fire with cannon on the Burmese army of 150,000 men with war elephants. The Burmese broke after a rear attack from Bai. The loyalists built boats and bridges to cross the Irrawaddy River but these were burned by Burmese commandos. A long siege of Ava ensued but the Burmese increased their defenses after tricking the Ming forces into leaving. The king of Burma Pindale Min was overthrown in a coup by his brother Pye Min, who went on the offensive against the Ming loyalists. Under the guise of a 'spirit water' ritual during the king's enthronement, most of the men in the Ming imperial retinue were ambushed and killed. The Burmese contacted the Qing to negotiate handing the emperor over. Subsequently, 100,000 Qing soldiers crossed into Burma. In 1662, the Yongli Emperor was captured by Wu Sangui near Ava and executed by strangulation in Yunnan, the same Wu whose surrender to the Manchus in April 1644 had allowed Dorgon to start the Qing expansion. Bai Wenxuan surrendered and was inducted into the Han Chinese banners. Li Dingguo, wrongly informed that the emperor had escaped, attempted to march for Vietnam and contacted Siam for an alliance, before finally dying of disease in August 1662. His final words were to tell his son to never surrender to the Qing (his son still did surrender, with the remainder of the army).

=== Seaborne resistance (1655–1663) ===
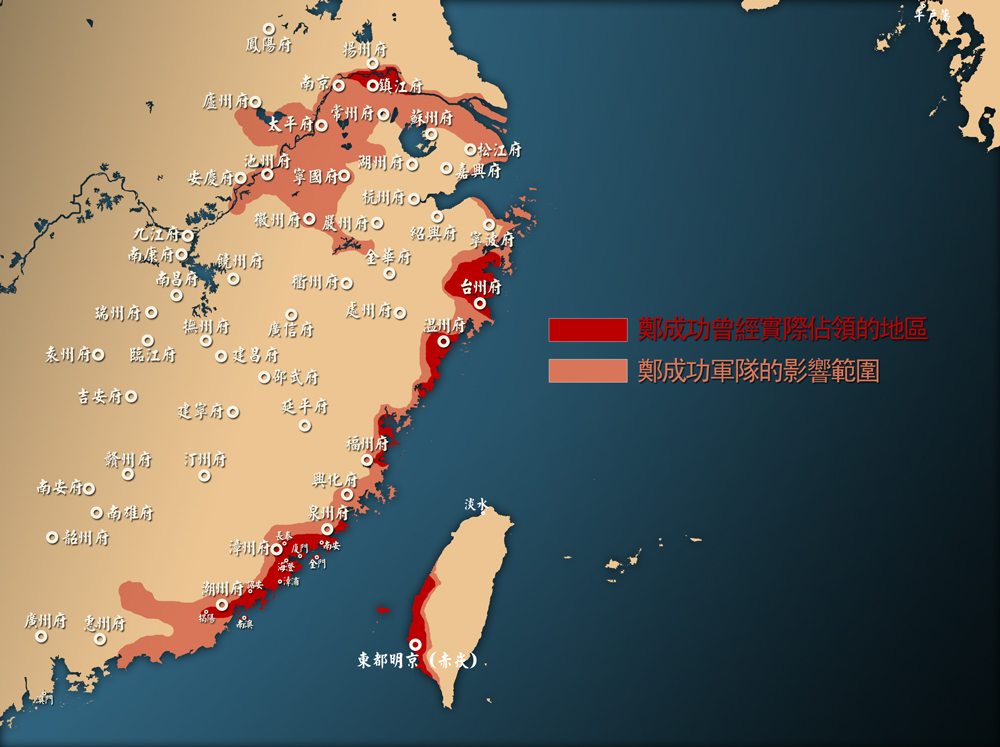
Extent of Koxinga's territory, shown in red

In 1656 a Lake Mao bandit named Qian Ying managed to acquire blank commissions from the Yongli regime, and he therefore managed to become legitimized as a Ming loyalist fighter. He organised a marine resistance unit and established links with Koxinga's forces. The Qing governor-general Han Chinese bannerman Lang Tingzuo quickly moved to suppress him, and launched a surprise attack which defeated him. Qian was hunted down and captured by March 1648. Only one year later did Koxinga launch an offensive, too late to join up with existing forces.

Zheng Chenggong ("Koxinga"), who had been adopted by the Longwu Emperor in 1646 and ennobled by Yongli in 1655, also continued to defend the cause of the Southern Ming. From Xiamen, he captured Chaozhou in 1650. With his help, sea lord Zhang Mingzhen had captured Zhoushan Island and Taizhou in 1655. In 1658 he attacked the coastline of Zhejiang province and finally cut the cable protecting the Yangtze estuary in 1659.

In 1659, just as Shunzhi was preparing to hold a special examination to celebrate the glories of his reign and the success of the southwestern campaigns, Zheng sailed up the Yangtze River with a well-armed fleet, took several cities from Qing hands, and went so far as to threaten Nanjing. Despite capturing many counties in his initial attack due to surprise and having the initiative, Koxinga announced the final battle in Nanjing ahead of time giving plenty of time for the Qing to prepare because he wanted a decisive, single grand showdown like his father successfully did against the Dutch at the Battle of Liaoluo Bay, throwing away the surprise and initiative which led to its failure. Koxinga's attack on Qing held Nanjing which would interrupt the supply route of the Grand Canal leading to possible starvation in Beijing caused such fear that the Manchus considered returning to Manchuria (Tartary) and abandoning China according to a 1671 account by a French missionary.

The commoners and officials in Beijing and Nanjing were waiting to support whichever side won. An official from Qing Beijing sent letters to family and another official in Nanjing, telling them all communication and news from Nanjing to Beijing had been cut off, that the Qing were considering abandoning Beijing and moving their capital far away to a remote location for safety since Koxinga's iron troops were rumored to be invincible. The letter said it reflected the grim situation being felt in Qing Beijing. The official told his children in Nanjing to prepare to defect to Koxinga which he himself was preparing to do. Koxinga's forces intercepted these letters and after reading them Koxinga may have started to regret his deliberate delays allowing the Qing to prepare for a final massive battle instead of swiftly attacking Nanjing. When the emperor heard of this sudden attack he is said to have slashed his throne with a sword in anger. But the siege of Nanjing was relieved and Zheng Chenggong repelled, forcing Zheng to take refuge in the southeastern coastal province of Fujian. Koxinga's Ming loyalists fought against a majority Han Chinese Bannermen Qing army when attacking Nanjing. The siege lasted almost three weeks, beginning on 24 August. Koxinga's forces were unable to maintain a complete encirclement, which enabled the city to obtain supplies and even reinforcements—though cavalry attacks by the city's forces were successful even before reinforcements arrived. Koxinga's forces were defeated and "slipped back" (Wakeman's phrase) to the ships which had brought them. Koxinga's forces were pursued to Xiamen where they were defeated in June 1660, and retreated to Taiwan.

After the admiral Shi Lang disobeyed orders, Koxinga executed his family causing him to defect to the Qing. Admiral Shi later led the Qing navy to victory over Koxinga's descendants. Koxinga implemented extremely harsh discipline on his soldiers which caused many of them to defect to the Qing. Failure to listen to orders and failing in battle could bring death sentences with no leniency from Koxinga. The Qing implemented a lenient policy towards defectors who defected from the Southern Ming, Koxinga, and the Three Feudatories, inviting and allowing them back into Qing ranks without punishment even after they initially betrayed the Qing and defected, and this policy was able to secure mass defections.

Pressured by Qing fleets, Koxinga fled to Taiwan in April 1661 and defeated the Dutch in the Siege of Fort Zeelandia, expelling them from Taiwan and setting up the Kingdom of Tungning. Great care was taken to symbolise support for the Ming legitimacy, an example being the use of the term guan instead of bu to name departments, since the latter is reserved for central government, whereas Taiwan was to be a regional office of the rightful Ming rule of China. Zheng Jing dutifully complied with the prescribed procedures for Ming officials by regularly presenting reports and paying tribute to the absent Ming Emperor. His originally stated intentions for conquering Taiwan from the Dutch also included the desire to protect Chinese settlers in Taiwan from maltreatment by the Dutch. The Ming dynasty princes who accompanied Koxinga to Taiwan were the Prince Zhu Shugui and Prince Zhu Honghuan, son of Zhu Yihai.

The Qing agreed to an alliance with the Dutch East India Company against the remaining Ming loyalists in Fujian and Taiwan. The Dutch intended to take a colonial outpost in Taiwan. In October 1663, the joint fleet succeeded in capturing Xiamen and Kinmen (Quemoy) from the Southern Ming. However, the Qing grew suspicious of Dutch ambitions to maintain a colony in Taiwan and to push for trading privileges, so the alliance collapsed. Admiral Shi Lang, who strongly objected to cession of Taiwan to the Dutch, offered to launch his own expedition instead. The Dutch looted relics and killed monks after attacking a Buddhist complex at Putuoshan on the Zhoushan Islands in 1665 during their war against Koxinga's son Zheng Jing. Zheng Jing's navy executed 34 Dutch sailors and drowned 8 Dutch sailors after ambushing, looting, and sinking the Dutch fluyt ship Cuylenburg in 1672 on northeastern Taiwan. Only 21 Dutch sailors escaped to Japan. The ship was going from Nagasaki to Batavia on a trade mission.

=== The Three Feudatories (1674–1681) ===
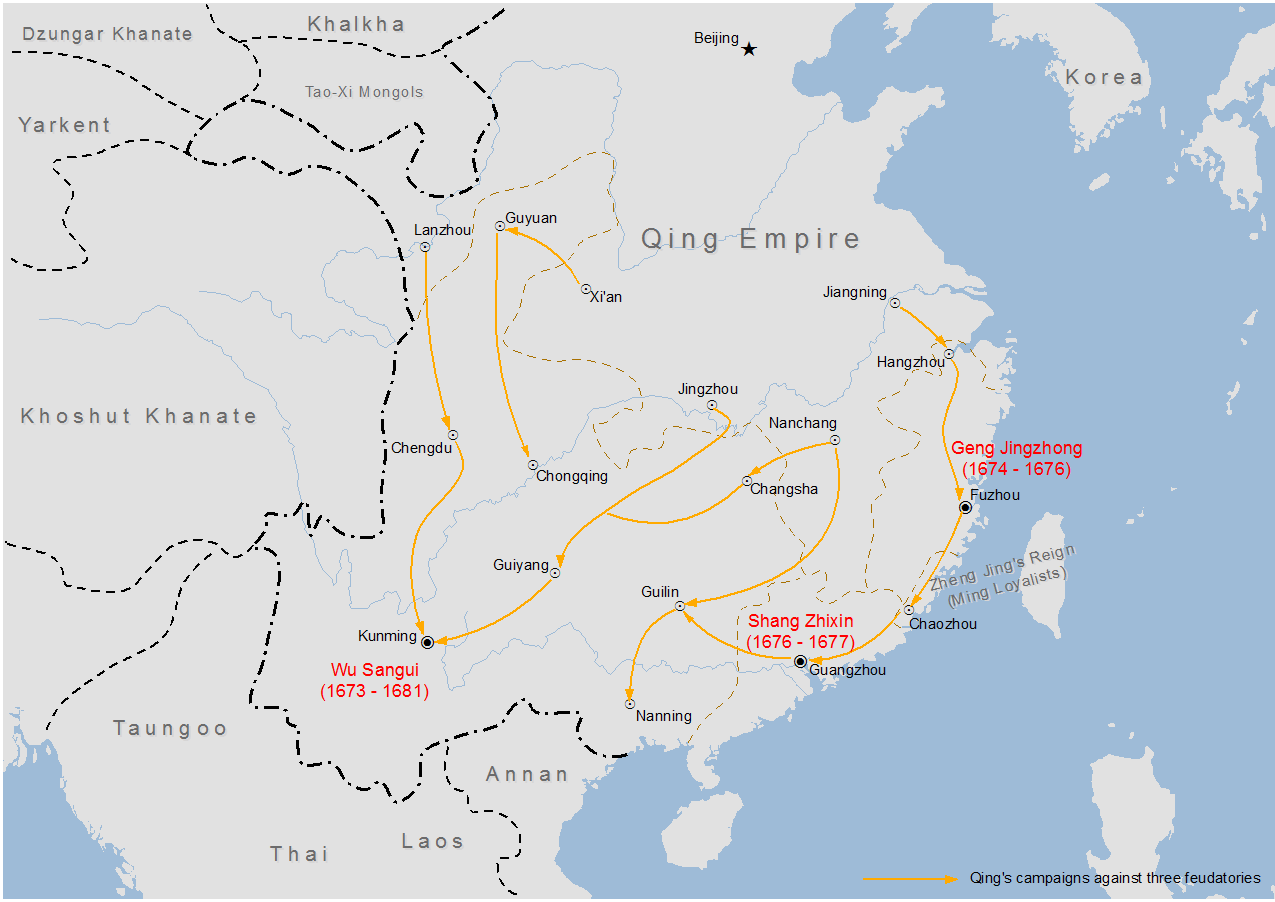
The revolt of the Three Feudatories

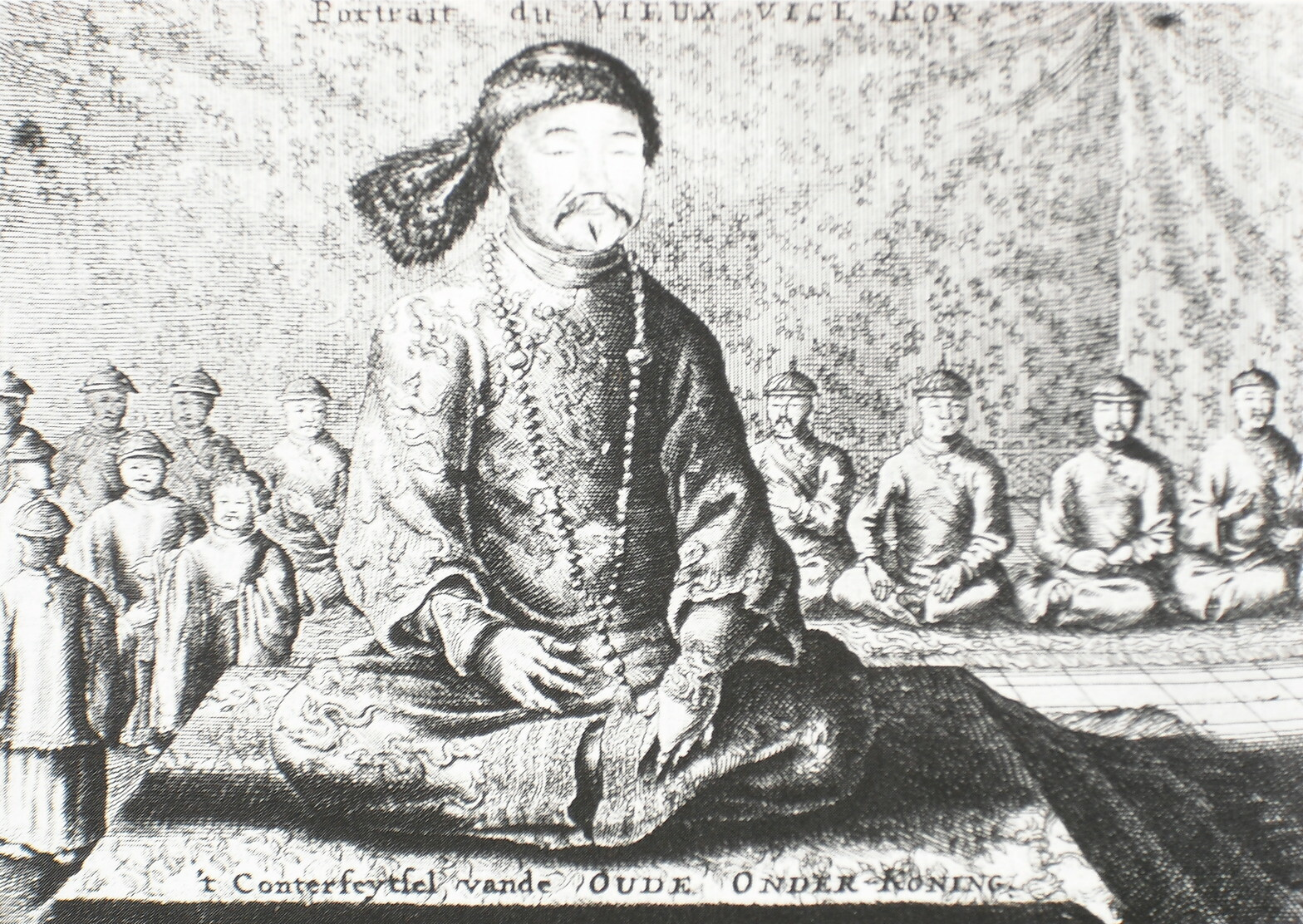
Portrait of Shang Kexi by Johan Nieuhof (1655). Shang recaptured Guangzhou from Southern Ming loyalist forces in 1650 and organized a massacre of the city's population. His son was one of the Three Feudatories who rebelled against the Qing in 1673.

The Qing had relied on Han Chinese Banner generals to defeat Li Chengdong and defend against the resistance in Taiwan, and they were forced to grant these generals vast autonomy and subsidies. In 1673, Wu Sangui, Shang Zhixin, and Geng Jimao, the "Three Feudatories", rebelled against the Kangxi Emperor. They were joined by generals Sun Yanling in Guangxi, Wang Fuchen in Shaanxi, and Wang Pingfan in Sichuan. Slaves revolted in Beijing as it was widely believed that the Qing would fall. The Kangxi Emperor called it the most harrowing experience in his life.

However, their disunity destroyed them. Shang Zhixin and Geng Jimao surrendered in 1681 after a massive Qing counteroffensive, in which the Han Chinese Green Standard Army played the major role with the Bannermen taking a backseat.

The rebellion was defeated mainly due to the refusal of most Han Chinese commanders to turn against the Qing dynasty. Particularly repulsive to many was the blatant opportunism of Wu Sangui, who had betrayed two dynasties in one lifetime: even Ming loyalists ridiculed his cause.

Fan Chengmo, son of Fan Wencheng, remained loyal to the Qing despite imprisonment and eventually death, and as one of the leading military families of Liaodong, his example inspired other Liaodong generals to remain loyal.

The Qing forces were crushed by Wu Sangui from 1673 to 1674. The Qing had the support of the majority of Han Chinese soldiers and Han Chinese elite against the Three Feudatories, since they refused to join Wu Sangui in the revolt, while the Eight Banners and Manchu officers fared poorly against Wu Sangui, so the Qing responded with using a massive army of more than 900,000 Han Chinese (non-Banner) instead of the Eight Banners, to fight and crush the Three Feudatories. Wu Sangui's forces were crushed by the Green Standard Army, made out of defected Ming soldiers. In the Three Feudatories rebellion, Han Chinese bannermen who stayed on the Qing side and died in battle were categorized as martyrs.

=== Surrender of Taiwan (1683) ===
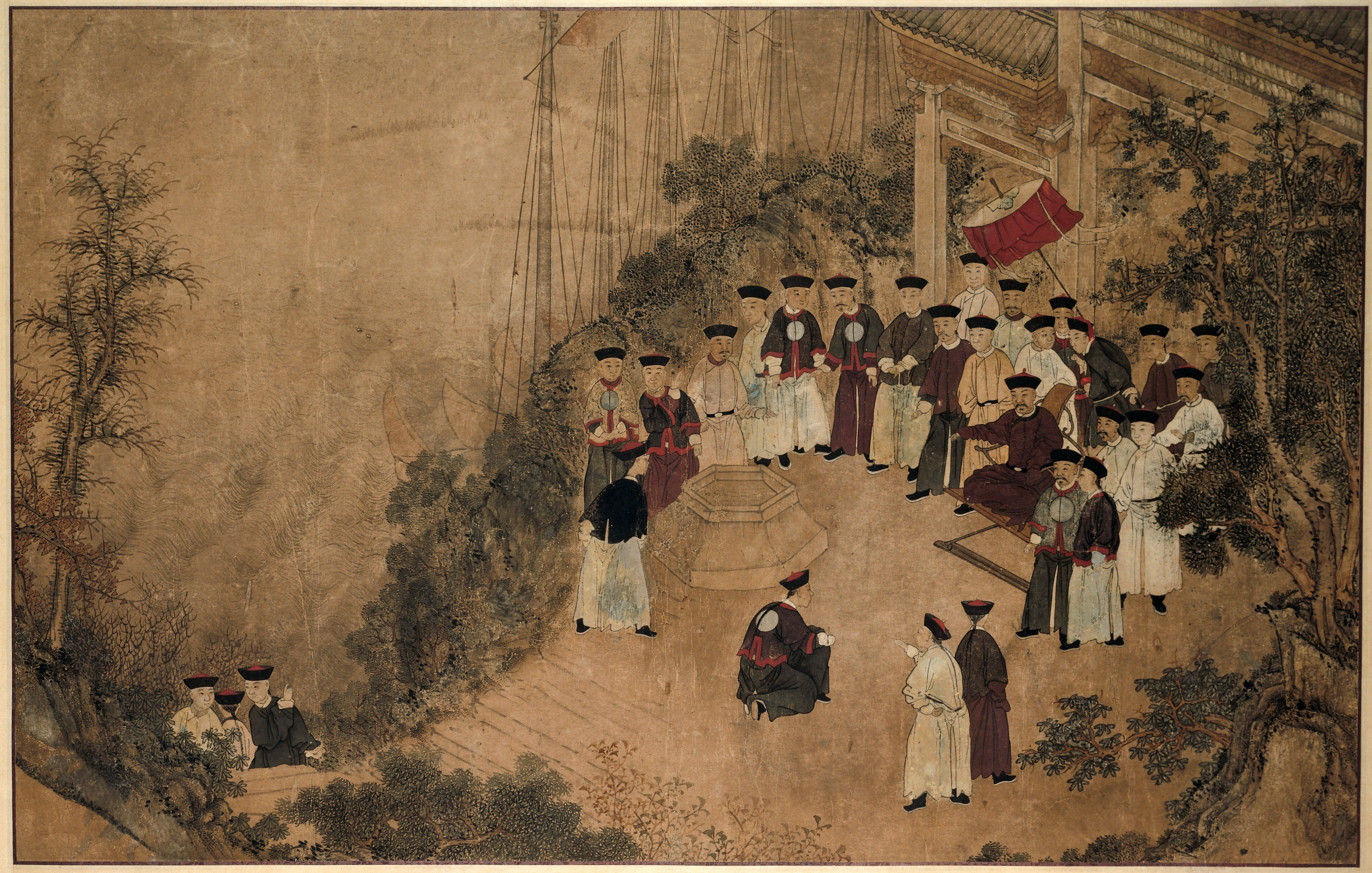
Shi Lang with a party of officials

Zheng Chenggong (Koxinga) had died in 1662. His descendants resisted Qing rule until 1683, when the Kangxi Emperor dispatched Shi Lang with a fleet of 300 ships to take the Ming loyalist Kingdom of Tungning in Taiwan in 1683 from the Zheng family. Zheng Chenggong's grandson Zheng Keshuang surrendered Taiwan to the Kangxi Emperor after the Battle of Penghu. Having lost this battle, Zheng Keshuang surrendered and was rewarded by the Kangxi Emperor with the title "Duke of Haicheng" (海澄公). He and his soldiers were inducted into the Eight Banners. His rattan shield troops (藤牌营; tengpaiying) served against Russian Cossacks at Albazin.

The Qing sent most of the 17 Ming princes still living on Taiwan back to mainland China where they spent the rest of their lives. The Prince of Ningjing and his five concubines committed suicide rather than submit to capture. Their palace was used as Shi Lang's headquarters in 1683 but he memorialized the emperor to convert it into a Mazu temple as a propaganda measure in quieting remaining resistance on Taiwan. The emperor approved its dedication as the Grand Matsu Temple the next year and, honoring the goddess Mazu for her supposed assistance during the Qing expansion, promoted her to "Empress of Heaven" (Tianhou) from her previous status as a heavenly consort (tianfei).

=== Ming loyalists in Vietnam ===
The Ming loyalist pirate Dương Ngạn Địch (Yang Yandi) (c) and his fleet sailed to Vietnam to leave the Qing dynasty in March 1682. Yang was a general of Ming China, and swore allegiance to Koxinga. His position was Chief Commander of Longmen (a place in modern Qinzhou, Guangxi). In 1679, after the Revolt of the Three Feudatories was put down by the Qing dynasty, he led 3,000 soldiers and 50 ships to Da Nang together with Hoàng Tiến, Trần Thượng Xuyên, and Trần An Bình. Dương Ngạn Địch and Hoàng Tiến were sponsored by Nguyễn Phúc Tần to settle Mỹ Tho, where Địch served as chief of a small Chinese community. The Nguyễn court allowed these resistance forces to resettle in Nam Ky, which had been newly conquered from the Khmers. These settlers named their settlements as "Minh Huong", to recall their allegiance to the Ming dynasty. Địch was murdered by his assistant Hoàng Tiến in 1688, who then revolted against the Nguyễn lord but was put down. In 1679, Trần Thượng Xuyên submitted to the Nguyễn lord and became a Nguyễn general and the Chinese community was allowed to settle in Đông Phố (modern Biên Hòa). Xuyên participated in various Nguyễn campaigns against Cambodia in 1689, 1699-1700, and in 1717.

== Literature and thought ==
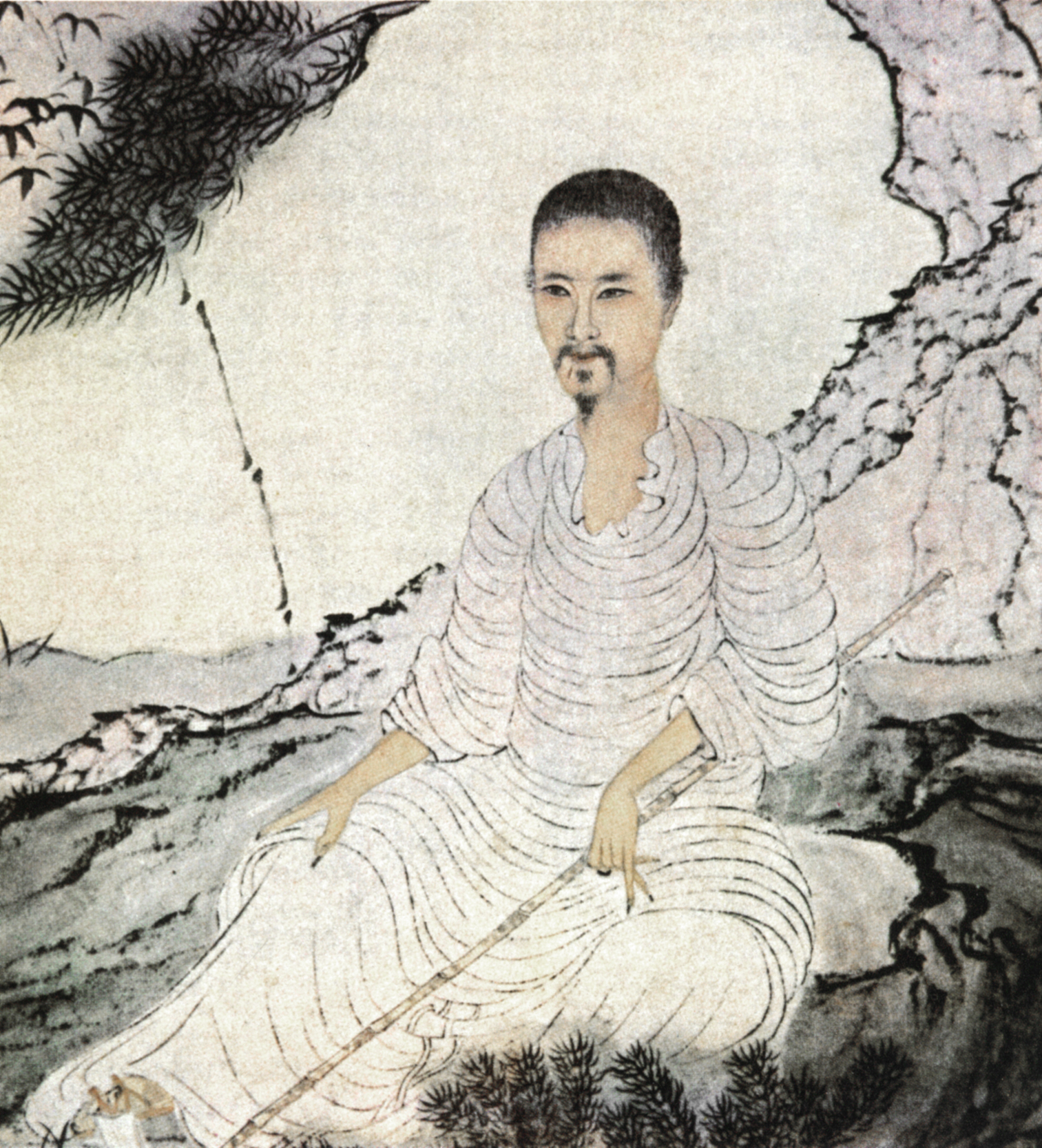
Shitao (1642–1707), who was related to the Ming imperial family, was one of many artists and writers who refused to give their allegiance to the Qing. Art historian Craig Clunas suggests that Shitao used a poem inscribed on this "Self-Portrait Supervising the Planting of Pines" (1674) to allude to the restoration of the Ming dynasty.

The defeat of the Ming dynasty posed practical and moral problems, especially for literati and officials. Confucian teachings emphasized loyalty (忠 zhōng), but the question arose as to whether Confucians should be loyal to the fallen Ming or to the new power, the Qing. Some, like the painter Bada Shanren, a descendant of the Ming ruling family, became recluses. Others, like Kong Shangren, who claimed to be a descendant of Confucius, supported the new regime. Kong wrote a poignant drama, The Peach Blossom Fan, which explored the moral decay of the Ming in order to explain its fall. Poets whose lives bridged the transition between Ming poetry and Qing poetry are attracting modern academic interest. (Note: For example, see Fong 2001, Chang 2001, Yu 2002, and Zhang 2002, passim.) Some of the most important first generation of Qing thinkers were Ming loyalists, at least in their hearts, including Gu Yanwu, Huang Zongxi, and Fang Yizhi. Partly in reaction and to protest the laxity and excess of the late Ming, they turned to evidential learning, which emphasized careful textual study and critical thinking. Another important group in this transitional period were the "Three Masters of Jiangdong"—Gong Dingzi, Wu Weiye and Qian Qianyi—who among other things contributed to a revival in the ci form of poetry.

The emperors, in order to legitimize their rule, encouraged Qing officials and literary figures to organize and appropriate the legacy of Chinese literature, producing anthologies and critical works. They also patronized the development of Manchu literature and the translation of Chinese classics into Manchu.

== Aftermath ==
Dulimbai Gurun is the Manchu name for China (Chinese: 中國; pinyin: Zhongguo; lit. 'Middle Kingdom'). After extinguishing the Ming, the Qing identified their state as "China" (Zhongguo), and referred to it as "Dulimbai Gurun" in Manchu. The Qing equated the lands of the Qing state (including present day Manchuria, Xinjiang, Mongolia, Tibet and other areas) as "China" in both the Chinese and Manchu languages, defining China as a multi-ethnic state, rejecting the idea that China only meant Han Chinese areas, proclaiming that both Han and non-Han peoples were part of "China", using "China" to refer to the Qing in official documents, international treaties, and foreign affairs, and the "Chinese language" (Dulimbai gurun i bithe) referred to Han Chinese, Manchu, and Mongol languages, and the term "Chinese people" (中國人; Zhongguo ren; Manchu Dulimbai gurun i niyalma) referred to all Han Chinese, Manchu, and Mongol subjects of the Qing.

During the Qing, many Han Chinese later found themselves in positions of power and influence in Manchu administration and even had their own slaves.

The Qing dynasty in 1820

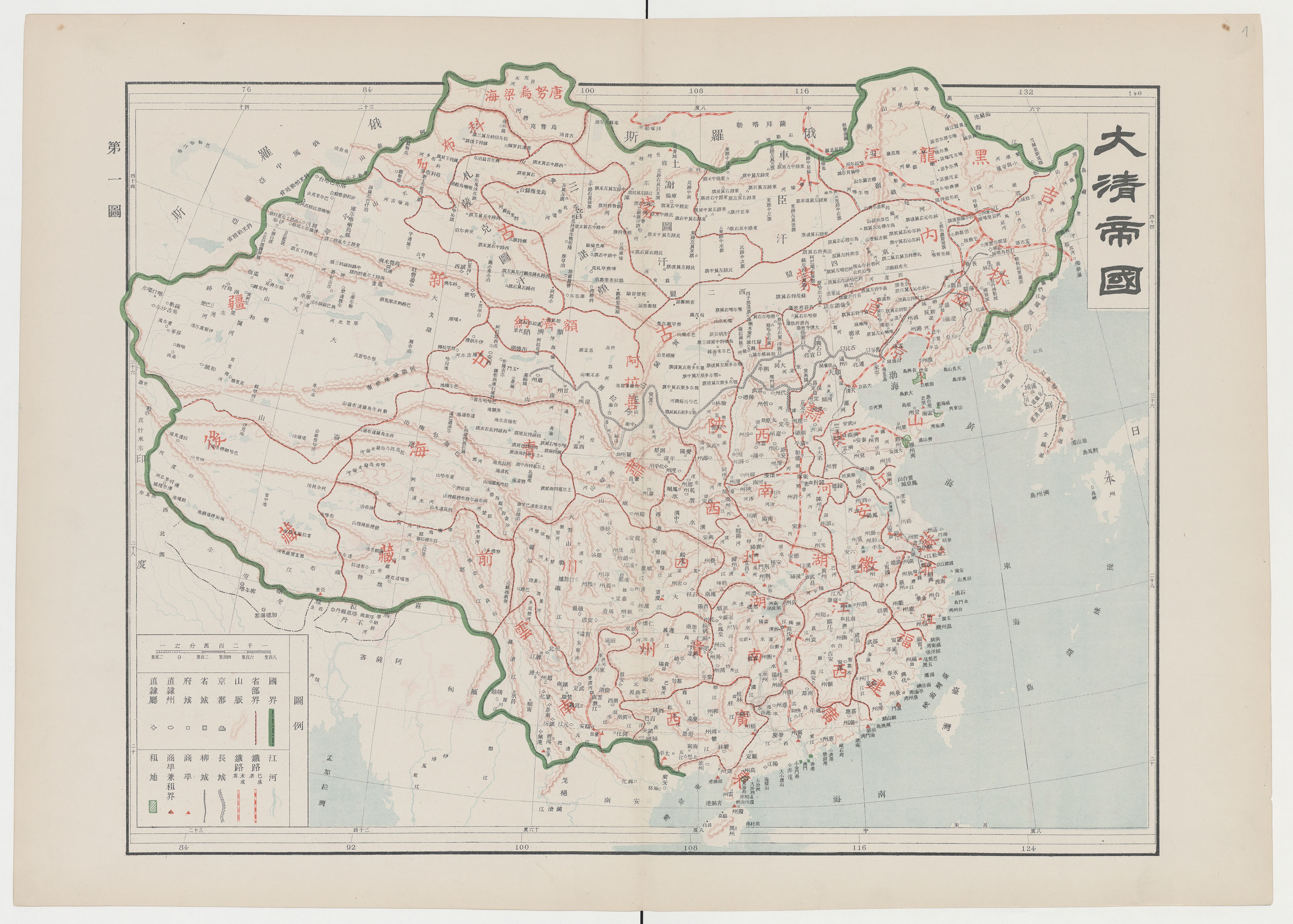
Official map of the Qing Empire published in 1905

When the Qing defeated Dzungar Mongols in 1759, they proclaimed that the Oirats territorial lands were absorbed into "China" (Dulimbai Gurun) realm in a Manchu language memorial. They expounded the ideology that they were bringing together the "outer" non-Han Chinese like the Khalkha Mongols, Inner Mongols, Oirats (including Tibetans, who were then under the rule of Oirat Khanates) together with the "inner" Han Chinese, into "one family" united under the Qing state. To show that the diverse subjects of the Qing were all part of one family, the Qing used the phrase Zhongwai yijia (中外一家; "central areas and outer areas as one realm") or neiwai yijia (內外一家; "interior and exterior of great-walls as one family"), to convey this idea of "unification" of the different peoples. A Manchu language version of a treaty with the Russian Empire concerning criminal jurisdiction over bandits called Qing subjects "people of the Central Kingdom (Dulimbai Gurun)". In the Manchu official Tulisen's Manchu language account of his meeting with the Torghut leader Ayuka Khan, it was mentioned that while the Torghuts were unlike the Russians, the "people of the Central Kingdom" (Manchu: dulimba-i gurun; 中國; Zhongguo) were like the Torghuts, and the "people of the Central Kingdom" referred to the Manchus.

The rebellions led by Li Zicheng, Zhang Xianzhong, and the subsequent expansion by the Qing was one of the most devastating wars in Chinese history. Examples of the devastation include the Yangzhou massacre, in which some 800,000 people, (although this number is now considered an exaggeration) including women and children, were massacred. The Qing carried out massacres in cities which resisted like Yangzhou and Guangzhou but did not carry out violence in cities which surrendered and capitulated to Qing rule like Beijing and Nanjing. Nanjing surrendered to the Qing without violence as all officials surrendered and defected. The once thriving province of Sichuan was thoroughly devastated and depopulated by massacres, epidemic disease, famine, and out-migration in the aftermath of the reign of the rebel Zhang Xianzhong. Zhang Xianzhong killed an unknown proportion of the province's population, with contemporary estimates, obviously exaggerated, given by the Ming Shi at 600 million; more realistic, albeit tentative, estimates range from 600 thousand to one million. A massive famine in Shaanxi had spurred Zhang Xianzhong and Li Zicheng to revolt and brutality by the rebels was widespread across northern China. This period saw innumerable natural disasters such as those caused by the Little Ice Age, and epidemics like the Great Plague during the last decade of the Ming dynasty caused the deaths of more than 200,000 people in Beijing in the year 1643 alone. Coastal China was also devastated by the Qing coastal evacuation order while fighting with the Koxinga regime. An estimated 25 million people died in China during the entire period. Some scholars estimate that the Chinese economy did not regain the level reached in the late Ming until the mid-Qing dynasty. According to economic historian Robert Allen, family income in the Yangtze delta, China's richest province, was actually below Ming levels in 1820 (but equal to that of contemporary Britain). However, the Qing encouraged settlements over larger portions of the empire since these regions offered the best opportunities to improve one's livelihood by clearing and farming large tracts. Economic growth in the middle and upper Yangtze regions complemented growth in the lower Yangtze, as more people began to move out of already crowded regions and into new lands of opportunity.

Immediately before the Ming dynasty was overthrown by Li Zicheng and the Qing entered Shanhai Pass, disease, famine, starvation and bandits ravaged the population of China. A disease killed half of the population in cities across China from 1640 to 1642 and three out of ten people in Huzhou died of plague and starvation. As the rural areas were hit by famine, peasants abandoned their homes by the millions, bandits took over Huguang, entire parts of the countryside in the middle of China were abandoned. Theft and begging by hungry peasants became widespread in cities and cannibalism spread all over famine-hit Henan. In 1641, northern China was hit by disease and plague spreading to Huangpi, and plague-infected corpses were the only food available to survivors. A massive drought in 1636 hit Huangpi amidst a series of natural disasters. Plague, locusts and famine spread all over. The plains and villages were hit by bandits and rebels, because starving refugees, orphans who had lost parents to disease as well as fired postal couriers and soldiers whose salary had been cut off turned into rebels in 1642 all over China.

China's population growth led to devastating death tolls due to famine from cold weather, drought and floods. Soil and anything that was consumable was eaten by people in 1637 in Jiangxi in a massive famine. The massive disease epidemic devastated South Zhili (Jiangnan) from 1641 to 1642 hitting the region twice, leaving corpses from the disease all over Zhili and killing 9 out of 10 across northern Zhejiang after it spread there from the Grand Canal from northwestern China. Due to the loss in people, crops were not farmed further exacerbating the famine. The Yangtze river delta's urban regions, the coastal southeast and the northwest were all hit by massive famine as the grain producing regions lost productivity. Massive deflation blew up as silver bullion remained in Fujian and stopped grain and payments for famine relief from reaching famine victims. The rebellions broke out because of these famines. Famine hit Hangzhou from 1640 to 1642, killing 50% of the population, forcing the impoverished to eat cocoons and silkworms, and forcing the rich to eat rice gruel. In multiple counties only three out of ten survived when Henan was hit by the 1641 disease plague epidemic.

Selected groups of Han Chinese bannermen were transferred en masse into Manchu Banners by the Qing, changing their ethnicity from Han Chinese to Manchu. Han Chinese bannermen of Tai Nikan (台尼堪; "watchpost Chinese") and Fusi Nikan (抚顺尼堪; "Fushun Chinese") backgrounds into the Manchu banners in 1740 by order of the Qing Qianlong emperor. It was between 1618 and 1629 when the Han Chinese from Liaodong who later became the Fushun Nikan and Tai Nikan defected to the Jurchens (Manchus). These Han Chinese-origin Manchu clans continue to use their original Han Chinese surnames and are marked as of Han Chinese origin on Qing lists of Manchu clans.

=== 1911 Xinhai revolution ===
Accounts of atrocities during the transition from the Ming to Qing were used by revolutionaries in the anti-Qing Xinhai revolution to fuel massacres against Manchus. Manchu bannermen and their families were massacred in several banner garrisons across China during the revolution, one of the massacres taking place in Xi'an. The Hui Muslim community was divided in its support for the 1911 Xinhai Revolution. The Hui Muslims of Shaanxi supported the revolutionaries and the Hui Muslims of Gansu supported the Qing. The local Hui Muslims (Mohammedans) of Xi'an (Shaanxi province) joined the Han Chinese revolutionaries in slaughtering the entire 20,000 Manchu population of Xi'an. The native Hui Muslims of Gansu province led by general Ma Anliang sided with the Qing and prepared to attack the anti-Qing revolutionaries of Xi'an city. Only some wealthy Manchus who were ransomed and Manchu females survived. Wealthy Han Chinese seized Manchu girls to become their slaves and Han Chinese troops seized young Manchu women to be their wives. Young Manchu girls were also seized by Hui Muslims of Xi'an during the massacre and brought up as Muslims.

== See also ==
- Manchuria under Ming rule
- Mandate of Heaven
- Ruguanxue
- Sino-Russian border conflicts
- Transition from Sui to Tang
- 1644 historical view

=== Mongolia, Tibet, and Xinjiang (c. 1620–1760) ===
- Dzungar–Qing Wars
- Qing conquest of Mongolia
- Qing conquest of Tibet
- Qing dynasty in Inner Asia (Xinjiang and parts of Central Asia)
- Mongolia under Qing rule
- Tibet under Qing rule
- Xinjiang under Qing rule
