= Tantai =

Qing dynasty general

First Class Duke Tantai

Minister of Personnel
- In office 17 January – 1 October 1651 Serving with Handai, Chen Mingxia
- Preceded by: Handai
- Succeeded by: Chentai

Personal details
- Born: 1594
- Died: 1651 (aged 56–57)

Military service
- Allegiance: Qing dynasty
- Branch/service: Manchu Plain Yellow Banner
- Battles/wars: Transition from Ming to Qing

Tantai (Chinese: 譚泰, 1594–1651) was a Qing dynasty general of Manchu ethnicity in the Plain Yellow Banner. He was a supporter of the powerful regent Dorgon. In 1644, he was made a duke, but because of having a feud with Soni and other people, he was demoted to a viscount in 1645, and a commoner in 1646. From 1646 to 1648, he was the private advisor to Dorgon. In 1648, he was appointed Senior General Who Attacks the South (征南大將軍) and was given command over the armies in Jiangxi who were fighting Jin Shenghuan. After quelling Jin's rebellion in 1649, he was again made a viscount, and in 1650, he rose to the rank of president of Board of Civil Office. After the death of Dorgon in 1650, Tantai transferred is loyalty to the Shunzhi Emperor and persecuted many of Dorgon's former supporters. For this, he was made a duke on March 25, 1651. However on October 1 the same year, he was charged with arrogant conduct, with interference in the affairs of the other five Boards, and with nepotism in office. In the course of his trial all those whom he had offended or wronged while Dorgon was in power came out to bring charges against him. Finally, he was ordered to be executed.

He had three sons: Kongniu (崆鈕), Tangguha (瑭古哈), and Luozhongniu (囉忠鈕).
