= Jin Shenghuan =

Chinese soldier (died 1649)

Jin Shenghuan (Chinese: 金聲桓, ?–1 March 1649), courtesy name Huchen (Chinese: 虎臣) was a soldier who served both the Ming and Qing dynasties. He was a native of Liaodong (modern-day Liaoyang).

== Life ==
Jin was a brigadier-general under the Ming general Huang Long (黃龍), and when Huang was defeated and killed at Lüshun in 1633 by the Manchus, Jin's wife and son were taken captive, but Jin manage to escape and join Zuo Liangyu in Henan. In 1645, he surrendered to Qing dynasty general Ajige at Jiujiang and was appointed general-in-chief of Jiangxi, and was charged with the responsibility of suppressing Ming loyalists. He successfully wiped out the Ming loyalists in Jiangxi without the help of Manchu troops and this was acknowledged with imperial honors. His family was released, his demand for wider discretionary power was regarded as excessive. He made an almost regal court of his military headquarters in Nanchang, where he had Taoist magicians which nursed his growing contempt for the Manchus.

In 1648, Jin rebelled, killed the governor, and declared allegiance to Zhu Youlang, who conferred upon him the title of Duke of Yuguo (豫國公). He also took in Jiang Yueguang (姜曰廣) as a subordinate. After failing to take Ganzhou, Manchu commander Tantai (譚泰) besieged the city. The siege stood for eleven months, but when the city was captured in 1649, Jin was wounded by an arrow and drowned himself in a pond. The Ming court conferred him the posthumous title Prince of Nanchang (南昌王) and the posthumous name Zhuangwu (壯武).
