= Ou Guangchen =

Ou Guangchen (simplified Chinese: 欧光宸; traditional Chinese: 歐光宸; pinyin: Ōu Guāngchén; Wade–Giles: Ou Kuang-chen), courtesy name Daihuang (戴皇), was a Ming dynasty leader of a militia who fought against the forces of the Qing dynasty. He was born in Bopu, Wuchuan, Guangdong.

== Life ==
=== Early life ===
Ou Guangchen was born in a scholarly family in Bopu, Wuchuan, Guangdong. In 1627, Ou Guangchen took the Provincial Examination(鄉試) and obtained a Juren(舉人) degree.

== See also ==
- Ming Dynasty
- Southern Ming
- Queue Order
