= List of hoaxes =

The following is a list of hoaxes:

== Exposure hoaxes ==
These types of hoaxes are semi-comical or private "sting operations" intended to expose people. They usually encourage people to act foolishly or credulously by falling for patent nonsense that the hoaxer deliberately presents as reality.

- The Atlanta Nights hoax novel.
- The practice of growing bonsai kittens in jars.
- The British television series Brass Eye, which encouraged celebrities to pledge their support to nonexistent causes to highlight their willingness to do anything for publicity.
- Dihydrogen monoxide, a facetious technical term for water.
- Disumbrationism, a hoax art exhibit.
- Genpets, a hoax mixed-media art installation of bio-engineered pet creatures.
- Grunge speak, an alleged slang of the Seattle rock underground, concocted by a Sub Pop employee and profiled in The New York Times.
- The house hippo hoax briefly perpetrated by Concerned Children's Advertisers in public service announcements designed to encourage children to view items in the media with a critical eye.
- The ID Sniper rifle, a rifle that shoots GPS-enabled microchips to mark and track suspects.
- The Morristown UFO hoax of 2009.
- The Pacific Northwest tree octopus (Octopus paxarbolis), an amphibious octopus.
- Project Alpha, which was orchestrated by James Randi and exposed poor research into psychic phenomena.
- The Quadrant hoax involving historian Keith Windschuttle.
- Joey Skaggs's media pranks, including Cathouse for Dogs (1976).
- SINA, the Society for Indecency to Naked Animals, the first media hoax of Alan Abel.
- The Sokal affair, which scrutinized an academic journal's intellectual rigor.
- The Straith hoax letter sent to George Adamski falsely stating that the US State Department endorsed his contactee claims; created by ufologists Gray Barker and James W. Moseley to bait Adamski into publicizing the forgery and thereby discrediting himself.
- Nat Tate, an imaginary artist about whom a biography was published in 1998 by William Boyd intended to temporarily fool the art world.
- The Taxil hoax by Léo Taxil, poking fun at the Roman Catholic Church's attitude toward Freemasonry.
- The avant-garde "music" of the fictitious Piotr Zak.
- Venus de Brizet, a statue discovered in a French farm field and declared a monument historique for presumed ancient Roman origins, before being revealed to have been buried as a publicity stunt by a living artist.

== Journalistic hoaxes ==
Deliberate hoaxes or journalistic scandals that have drawn widespread attention include:

- Jayson Blair, reporter for The New York Times.
- Cello scrotum, a hoax medical condition originally published as a brief case report in the British Medical Journal in 1974.
- Conspiracy 58, a Swedish mockumentary about the 1958 FIFA World Cup.
- Janet Cooke, who won the Pulitzer Prize for her fictitious Washington Post story about an eight-year-old heroin addict named Jimmy.
- Sidd Finch, a fictitious yogi and pitcher who threw a 168 mph ball, supposedly discovered by the Mets and profiled by George Plimpton in Sports Illustrated for April Fool's Day 1985.
- The Flemish Secession hoax of 2006.
- Fuckart & Pimp, a hoax exhibition at London's Decima gallery which purported to be the show of a female artist having sex with clients to consummate the sale of her paintings, created a worldwide media scandal but was later revealed to be a hoax.
- Stephen Glass, reporter for The New Republic.
- The Great Moon Hoax of 1835; Edgar Allan Poe would later claim that this was inspired by his own story "The Unparalleled Adventure of One Hans Pfaall," which was published only a few months before.
- The Great Wall of China hoax of 1899, a fake news article describing bids by American businesses on a contract to demolish the Great Wall of China and construct a road in its place. The story was reprinted by a number of newspapers.
- Johann Hari, journalist for The Independent, The New York Times, The Huffington Post and other media organizations, who committed acts of plagiarism, fabricated sources and quotes, and posted malicious comments to social media and edits to the Wikipedia biographies of his critics and opponents. Hari was forced to return the Orwell Prize (which he won in 2008) after it was withdrawn by the Orwell Prize Council.
- The Holocaust teaching hoax of 2007.
- Washington Irving, who created a hoax about the supposedly missing Diedrich Knickerbocker.
- Jack Kelley, longtime USA Today correspondent who resigned in 2004 following a scandal.
- David Lassman, who wrote the 2007 "Rejecting Jane" article, which chronicled Jane Austen's rejection by modern-day publishers.
- The New York Zoo hoax of 1874.
- Nik Cohn's New York magazine article, "Tribal Rites of the New Saturday Night", which was the source material for the movie Saturday Night Fever, and which Cohn admitted decades later had been fiction, not reportage.
- David Manning, a fictitious film critic created by Sony in order to praise Columbia Pictures films for advertising purposes.
- Edgar Allan Poe created a hoax of moon travel in "The Unparalleled Adventure of One Hans Pfaall," as well as The Balloon-Hoax, a hoax newspaper article about the first transatlantic balloon trip (1844).
- "A Rape on Campus", an article written by Sabrina Erdely and published by Rolling Stone magazine that reported an alleged gang rape of a female college student by college men in graphic detail, but was later found to have been entirely fabricated by the "victim" and the journalist.
- San Serriffe, a fictional island nation made the subject of an extensive report created for April Fools' Day 1977 by Britain's Guardian newspaper.
- Frank Scully's columns for Variety magazine and his 1950 book Behind the Flying Saucers, which said the US government had recovered crashed flying saucers and bodies of extraterrestrials. His sources were the con men behind the Aztec crashed saucer hoax, but he refused to admit he had been hoaxed despite national magazine exposés.
- The Sultan of Llang-Llang was the creation of Robert A. McLean, a Marine Corps recruiter working in Manhattan in 1919. His story, expected to be a one-day gag, became a national–and even international–sensation.

== Other hoaxes ==
This list does not include hoax articles published on or around April 1, a long list of which can be found in the List of April Fools' Day jokes article.

=== A–C ===
- Cedric Allingham, a fictitious author who wrote a book about meeting the pilot of a Martian spacecraft. Allingham was created by British astronomer Patrick Moore and his friend Peter Davies.
- Alien Autopsy, a hoax film by Ray Santilli.
- Alternative 3, a 1977 British mockumentary about a global government conspiracy to evacuate world luminaries to Mars before an expected apocalypse. The film is a work of fiction meant to satirize conspiracy theories, but some conspiracy theorists believed it was part of an actual conspiracy.
- Amina Abdallah Arraf al Omari, a fictitious Syrian blogger.
- The Amityville Horror, ghostly events reported by the buyers of a house where another family had been murdered.
- The Archko Volume, a collection of documents purportedly related to the life of Jesus.
- Atlanta Nights, a deliberately bad collaborative novel written by a group of science fiction and fantasy authors under the pen name "Travis Tea" to expose PublishAmerica as a vanity press.
- The Awful Disclosures of Maria Monk, a book about the purported sexual enslavement of a nun.
- The Aztec crashed saucer hoax, a 1948 flying saucer crash in Aztec, New Mexico, concocted by two con men to sell equipment said to incorporate reverse-engineered extraterrestrial technology. Although the pair was convicted of fraud for this enterprise, reports of the crash—notably those written by Frank Scully—were later taken seriously by ufologists.
- The balloon boy hoax, about a boy reported to be traveling uncontrollably at high altitude in a homemade helium balloon, but was later discovered to be hiding in the attic of his house.
- Bananadine, a fictional drug supposedly made from bananas.
- The bathtub hoax, an imaginary history of the bathtub published by H. L. Mencken.
- Johann Beringer's Lying Stones, carvings of fictitious animal fossils.
- The Berners Street hoax that occurred in Westminster, England in 1810.
- Franz Bibfeldt, a fictitious theologian originally invented to provide a footnote for a divinity school student, which later became an in-joke among academic theologians.
- The Big Donor Show, a hoax reality television program in the Netherlands about a terminally ill woman donating her kidneys to one of three people requiring a transplantation.
- C. W. Blubberhouse, whose letters in UK national newspapers were exposed as a hoax by the Sunday Times.
- Blue waffle, a supposedly contagious sexually-transmitted infection affecting only women, causing a blue discoloration of the vagina.
- Pierre Brassau, a pseudonym for a chimpanzee whose art was exhibited in a gallery under the presumption that Brassau was a real human artist. The chimpanzee received positive reviews from several critics.
- The Calaveras Skull, a human skull found by miners in Calaveras County, California, which was purported to prove that humans, mastodons, and elephants had coexisted in California.
- The Cardiff Giant, a hoax of a hoax; P. T. Barnum had a replica made because he could not obtain the "genuine" hoax item.
- Otis T. Carr's flying saucer, which he claimed would be capable of space travel using "free energy" principles developed by Nikola Tesla.
- The CERN ritual, a supposed occult sacrifice on the grounds of CERN.
- China Under the Empress Dowager, co-authored by Sir Edmund Backhouse, 2nd Baronet using a forged diary as a major source, with a manuscript of Backhouse's memoirs also being mostly fiction. He also falsely represented himself as representing the Chinese Imperial Court in business deals and donated forged books to the Bodleian Library.
- The Cottingley Fairies, photographs of cut-out fairies believed to be real.
- Crop circles; English pranksters Doug Bower and Dave Chorley claimed they started the phenomenon, and hundreds of "copycat" circles have been fabricated since by other hoaxers.

=== D–F ===
- Dahu, a legendary creature known in France, Switzerland, and northern Italy.
- The disappearing blonde gene, a hoax claiming that natural blondes would become extinct.
- Document 12-571-3570, supposedly establishing that sex had taken place during a NASA space mission.
- The Donation of Constantine, a forged imperial decree by which the 4th-century emperor Constantine the Great supposedly transferred authority over Rome and the Western Roman Empire to the Pope.
- Drake's Plate of Brass, a forgery that purported to be the brass plaque that Francis Drake posted upon landing in Northern California in 1579.
- The Dreadnought hoax, perpetrated in 1910 by Horace de Vere Cole and a group of friends who, pretending to be an official delegation from Abyssinia, tricked the Royal Navy into giving them an official tour of the battleship HMS Dreadnought.
- Drop bears, a supposed dangerous species of koala.
- The Elm Guest House hoax, false allegations that prominent British men had engaged in child sexual abuse at a London hotel.
- The Emulex hoax, a stock manipulation scheme.
- The English Mercurie, a literary hoax purporting to be the first English-language newspaper.
- The Fiji mermaid, the supposed remains of a half-fish half-human hybrid.
- The furry trout, a fictional legendary creature consisting of a trout with a thick coat of fur.

=== G–I ===
- Gay Jesus film hoax, a long-running chain letter claiming that a movie depicting Jesus as a gay swinger will soon be released
- Geostationary Banana Over Texas, an apparent hoax to secure artistic funding.
- Going Places, a public media debate on the nature of art provoked by University of Leeds art students pretending to take a week-long vacation in Spain, then presenting the vacation as their end-of-year project.
- The Gorgeous Guy, an apparently motiveless hoax which gained the perpetrator some media attention.
- The Gosford Glyphs, a supposed group of Egyptian hieroglyphs discovered in the 1970s in Central Coast, New South Wales, Australia.
- Grávida de Taubaté, a Brazilian woman who pretended to be pregnant with quadruplets in 2012 and gained national media attention before her pregnancy was revealed to be bogus.
- The Michael Guglielmucci cancer scandal, in which a pastor claimed to have terminal cancer.
- The Gulf Breeze UFO incident, alleged unidentified flying object (UFO) sightings and photographs by a man in Gulf Breeze, Florida in 1987–1988; a small UFO model was found hidden in his former home in 1990, and his photos could be closely duplicated using the model.
- Hamas baby beheading hoax, refers to claims, since refuted, that Hamas killed and beheaded dozens of babies and toddlers during the October 7 attacks which it led in southern Israel in 2023.
- Hanxin, a DSP microchip claimed to be developed completely by Chen Jin himself, later found to be a Motorola microchip with its original trademark sanded away.
- Tania Head (Alicia Esteve Head), who claimed to be a 9/11 survivor and received widespread media attention.
- "Here Comes Sophie", an alleged animated movie based on the Belgian comic Sophie. A number of posters circulated on the Net, but eventually it was found to be a hoax.
- Joice Heth, an African-American slave exhibited by P. T. Barnum as George Washington's nurse.
- Histoire de l'Inquisition en France, a forged 1829 book by Étienne-Léon de Lamothe-Langon.
- Francis Hetling, a fictional Victorian era photographer whose photographs were widely shown as real.
- Marie Sophie Hingst, a German woman who claimed to be the Jewish descendant of Holocaust survivors.
- The Hitler Diaries, purportedly written by Adolf Hitler.
- "Hold on Tight!", a hoax episode of the British TV comedy Inside No. 9 which was advertised to be broadcast, but was never actually made.
- The Horn Papers, a genealogical hoax.
- Hunting for Bambi, a fictional competition to hunt semi-naked women with paintball guns in the deserts of Las Vegas.
- Hurricane Shark or Street Shark, a recurring hoax appearing to show a shark swimming in a flooded urban area, usually after a hurricane. A 2022 video of such a shark or large fish, however, proved to be real.
- I, Libertine, a hoax perpetrated by Jean Shepherd to manipulate the New York Times Best Seller list, which was later developed into a real book.
- The iOS 8 "Apple Wave" microwave charging online hoax, claiming that microwaving an iPhone would charge it.
- The Ireland Shakespeare forgeries, a collection of Shakespeare-related documents supposedly discovered by William Henry Ireland and published in 1795 by his father, Samuel Ireland; the discoveries included a "lost" play, Vortigern and Rowena.
- Clifford Irving's biography of Howard Hughes.

=== J–M ===
- The jackalope, a legendary animal described as a jackrabbit with antlers.
- The Jacko hoax, a supposed gorilla or sasquatch caught near Yale, British Columbia, in 1884.
- The Trevor Jacob plane crash, which Jacob deliberately staged in 2021 for YouTube views, claiming it was an accident caused by engine failure.
- Pope Joan, a woman who allegedly served as pope of the Roman Catholic Church from 855–857 while posing as a man, and was reportedly killed after unexpectedly giving birth.
- Kryakutnoy, the purported Russian inventor of the hot air balloon.
- Killswitch A videogame that was supposedly created in the late 1980s by a company called Karvina Corporation. The player could choose to play as a woman called Porto or as a demon-like character named Ghast, and the game deleted itself from the disk upon completion.
- The Lady Hope Story, a claim of Charles Darwin's deathbed reversion to Christianity.
- Lenin was a mushroom, a television hoax by Soviet musician Sergey Kuryokhin and reporter Sergey Sholokhov. It was first broadcast on 17 May 1991 on Leningrad Television.
- The Ligma-Johnson hoax, hatched by two amateur actors pretending to be recently fired Twitter employees.
- Lucy Lightfoot, a supposed legend from the Isle of Wight about a girl who disappeared in 1831; she was later admitted to have been made up in the 1960s by the vicar of St Olave's Church, Gatcombe.
- Llandegley International Airport, a non-existent airport indicated by a real roadside sign in Wales since 2002.
- The Majestic 12 papers documenting a secret US government committee investigating UFO activity in the 1950s. The existence of the committee remains disputed, but the papers are broadly agreed to be forgeries produced by ufologist Bill Moore or supplied to him as a prank.
- Ern Malley, a fictitious poet.
- The Mars hoax (also called the Two Moons hoax), a yearly hoax started in 2003 that falsely claims that at a certain date, Mars will appear as large as a full moon.
- The Masked Marauders, a non-existent album "reviewed" as a prank by Rolling Stone magazine. The album was alleged to feature a jam session between Bob Dylan, Mick Jagger, John Lennon, and Paul McCartney. Shortly thereafter, Rolling Stone hired several celebrity impersonators and session musicians to record the album.
- Eva and Franco Mattes have perpetrated a number of hoaxes, including the fake Vatican web site "vaticano.org" and the fictitious artist Darko Maver.
- The Maury Island incident, a 1947 flying saucer hoax that Fred Crisman and Harold Dahl concocted to sell to a science fiction magazine. The men initially said that a mysterious stranger in a dark suit warned them to keep quiet; this may be the first report of men in black, later a common element in UFO folklore.
- Han van Meegeren, a prolific Dutch art forger who revealed his craft to defend himself from criminal charges in the Netherlands for having sold the Nazi leader Hermann Göring a fake Vermeer painting believed by experts to be an authentic national treasure; he painted another fake Vermeer in prison to prove he was a virtuoso forger who had defrauded Göring, for which he became a national hero.
- The Microsoft acquisition hoax, a 1994 hoax claiming that Microsoft had acquired the Roman Catholic Church. The hoax is considered to be the first hoax to reach a mass audience on the Internet. Despite debunking by Microsoft, similar stories about Microsoft and other companies implementing unrealistic acquisitions continued.
- The Miscovich emeralds hoax, an attempt by a diver to pass modern emeralds off as treasures from a sunken Spanish galleon.
- The Momo Challenge, a fake social media challenge supposedly encouraging children to injure and kill themselves.
- The Monster of Lake Fagua, an 18th-century hoax about a dragon-like monster supposedly found in Spanish Peru.
- The Robert Mueller sexual assault hoax, perpetrated by far-right conspiracy theorists Jack Burkman and Jacob Wohl.
- The Maggie Murphy hoax, a hoax that claimed that a farmer grew an oversized potato.

=== N–P ===
- Naked Came the Stranger: a 1969 novel by a group of American journalists attempting to satisfy, and thus expose, what they perceived as degraded standards in popular American literature; it succeeded, selling about 90,000 copies before the hoax was revealed.
- Nibiru cataclysm: a rogue planet and doomsday theory involving a planet collision with Earth. Debunked by NASA and others as a hoax.
- The Niger uranium forgeries, false documents suggesting Saddam Hussein was to purchase uranium from Niger.
- Nullarbor Nymph, a hoax perpetrated in Australia between 1971 and 1972 that involved supposed sightings of a half-naked woman living amongst kangaroos on the Nullarbor Plain.
- Ompax spatuloides, a "fish" supposedly discovered in 1872 in Australia as a practical joke on Karl Theodor Staiger, which also fooled Francis de Laporte de Castelnau into writing a scientific description of the "species". It was made of a mullet, an eel, and the head of a platypus.
- The Works of Ossian, "translated" by James MacPherson.
- Our First Time, an early popularized Internet hoax involving two purported 18-year-olds who claimed they would live broadcast themselves losing their virginity.
- Our Race Will Rule Undisputed Over The World, a fake document alleging Jewish superiority over Gentiles by a non-existent rabbi named Emmanuel Rabinovich.
- Edward Owens, a fictitious fisherman turned pirate whose story was perpetrated on the English-language Wikipedia in 2008 by a class at George Mason University.
- Pan Am Flight 914, a hoax about a flight that disappeared and landed thirty years later.
- Pé de Chinesa, a fictional Brazilian soap opera.
- The Pepsi needle hoax, a series of fraudulent claims about finding needles in cans of Pepsi made in 1993.
- The perpetual motion engines built by John Ernst Worrell Keely and Charles Redheffer.
- The Persian Princess, a mummy of an alleged princess which surfaced in October 2000. It proved to be an archaeological forgery and possibly a modern murder victim.
- The Piltdown Man, whose remains were purported to be "the missing link" between apes and humans.
- Plainfield Teachers College, a fictitious school whose football scores ended up in major newspapers in 1941.
- Platinum Weird, a deliberate hoax by Dave Stewart and Kara DioGuardi about a fictitious band from 1974 promoted using false advertising.
- The Pompey stone, a stone carved as a hoax in the 1820s and dated to 1520, revealed in 1894.
- Cornelis Poortman, a Dutch official of the Dutch East Indies who supposedly recovered two Chinese chronicles from Palembang, Sumatra and Cirebon, Java.
- The Poppy Fields, a made-up band that earned a number 24 hit for "45 RPM", a song they had not recorded.
- Prester John, fictitious 12th-century king of a powerful but vaguely described and non-existent Christian empire in Asia, and the alleged writer of a famous forged letter likely written to build support for the Crusades.
- Princess Caraboo, also known as Mary Baker, a woman in England who alleged to be a princess from a far-off land.
- The Priory of Sion, a made-up secret society that plays a prominent role in The Da Vinci Code.
- Progesterex, a fictitious date-rape drug.
- Prophecy of the Popes, a Latin document predicting the next Popes.
- The Protocols of the Elders of Zion, a hoax and forgery but nevertheless a book instrumental to the surge of antisemitism during the twentieth century.
- George Psalmanazar, who claimed to come from "Formosa".
- Psychic surgery, a pseudoscientific medical practice where the practitioner pretends to perform surgery on the patient.

=== Q–S ===
- Q33 NY, an Internet hoax based on the 9/11 attacks.
- The quiz show scandals of the 1950s, wherein game shows were presented as legitimate contests despite being fixed or completely scripted.
- A Racial Program for the Twentieth Century, an antisemitic fake document.
- James Reavis, so-called Baron of Arizona, an American forger who planted fake Spanish documents indicating he was the rightful owner of a very large fictitious land grant in the western United States.
- Tamara Rand's prediction of the 1981 assassination attempt on Ronald Reagan, which was actually made after the fact (Randi 1982:329).
- Redcore, a Chinese browser purported to be developed in-house, but was revealed to be based on Chromium.
- "Rejecting Jane", an article that chronicles publishing houses' rejection of the opening chapters of Jane Austen novels submitted to them under a pseudonym by British writer David Lassman.
- The Report from Iron Mountain, a literary hoax claiming that the United States government had concluded that peace was not in the economy's best interest.
- Rhinogradentia, a fictitious order of mammals with noses adapted to perform a variety of functions. Members of the order were purported to be endemic to one Pacific archipelago, and to have gone extinct due to nearby nuclear testing.
- The Rosenhan experiment, involving the admission of healthy "pseudopatients" to twelve psychiatric hospitals.
- Rosie Ruiz, who cheated in the 1980 Boston Marathon.
- Sally the Dunstable Witch, a fictional spirit devised by a local headmaster to shame the vicar into tidying up the churchyard.
- Science Femme, a Twitter hoax in which a white male science professor posed as an immigrant woman of color and posted anti-LGBTQ rhetoric and criticism of diversity, equity, and inclusion.
- "Seriously McDonalds", a viral photograph apparently showing a racist policy introduced by McDonald's.
- Michael Shrimpton, who perpetrated a hoax that German intelligence was planning a nuclear attack on the 2012 Summer Olympics.
- The skvader, a form of winged hare supposedly indigenous to Sweden.
- The Sloot Digital Coding System, a method of data compression claimed by inventor Jan Sloot to be capable of compressing digital video into far less memory than is believed to be mathematically possible. Sloot died and his design notes were never found, but the device he used for demonstrations was found to have been rigged.
- The Jussie Smollett hate crime hoax, a supposed anti-gay, anti-black attack on the Empire actor in Chicago.
- The Songs of Bilitis, supposed ancient Greek poems "discovered" by Pierre Louÿs.
- The Southern Television broadcast interruption, a hoax message inserted into an IBA broadcast in the United Kingdom on 26 November 1977.
- Space Cadets, a 2005 TV programme by Channel 4 in which participants were deceived into believing they were on a five-day trip in low Earth orbit.
- Spectra, a 1916 publication heralding a hoax poetry movement.
- The Springfield pet-eating hoax, an online, far-right anti-immigration hoax from Springfield, Ohio, that claimed that Haitian immigrants were eating pets, specifically cats and dogs.
- Stardrive 2000, a 1986 radio advertising hoax in Portland, Oregon to promote the effectiveness of radio advertising by advertising a fictional automobile.
- Star Fox Grand Prix, a 2018 video game hoax alleging that a new Star Fox racing game was being developed by developer Retro Studios.
- James Vicary's "subliminal" advertising .
- The "surgeon's photograph" of the Loch Ness Monster.
- The Sweden sex competition hoax, which stated in 2023 that Sweden had officially declared sex a sport and was hosting Europe's first-ever sex competition.

=== T–Z ===
- The Taughannock Giant, a petrified giant "discovered" in Ithaca, New York, in 1879. This copycat hoax was inspired by the Cardiff Giant ten years earlier.
- The Manti Te'o girlfriend hoax, in which the football player was catfished.
- Thatchergate, a fake conversation with which the punk band Crass fooled the governments of the US and UK.
- The slowing of satellites above Tirunallar Saniswaran Temple due to mysterious UV rays from Saturn, claimed to be "a miracle" by NASA.
- That Evil Farming Game An alleged video game that involves a farmer killing his wife and hiding her body from police while working on his farm.
- Mary Toft, an English woman who convinced doctors that she gave birth to rabbits.
- Toothing, an invented fad about people using Bluetooth-enabled mobile devices to arrange sexual encounters.
- The tourist guy, a fake photo of a tourist at the top of the World Trade Center building on 9/11 with a plane about to crash in the background.
- Trodmore Racecourse, a fictitious Cornish race meeting.
- Taro Tsujimoto, a fictional Japanese ice hockey player selected by the Buffalo Sabres in the 1974 NHL amateur draft. The Sabres' general manager, Punch Imlach, made the selection as a protest against the NHL's draft procedures.
- The Turk, a chess-playing "automaton" that actually contained a person.
- Tuxissa, a computer virus hoax.
- Benjamin Vanderford's fake beheading video.
- The Villejuif leaflet, a pamphlet distributed in Europe with claims of various food additives having carcinogenic effects.
- Bradley Walsh's Million Pound Shot, a hoax game show aired on Channel 4 which was revealed to be an anti-gambling documentary.
- David Weiss, a fictitious person that was used by the Jerusalem Post as a source and was later revealed to be a Norwegian man.
- Laurel Rose Willson's claims to be a survivor of Satanic ritual abuse (as Lauren Stratford), and of the Holocaust (as Laura Grabowski).
- The Wolpertinger, a Bavarian cousin of the jackalope.
- The White House debate competition hoax, in which a virtual debate competition was supposedly dominated by a Bangladeshi student.
- Yeah Yeah Beebiss I, An alleged video game whose name appeared in a 1989 ad in the magazine VideoGames & Computer Entertainment.
- Zepotha, a non-existent movie created to promote the new album of a TikToker named Emily Jeffri
- Zzxjoanw, a fictitious word that fooled logologists for 70 years.

=== 0–9 ===
- The 2010 Georgian news report hoax, a hoax TV report aired on Georgian television.

== See also ==
- List of spurious works of fiction – Fictional works not confirmed to exist
- Beale ciphers, 19th century texts alleged to state the location of hidden treasure, but thought to be hoaxes by some researchers
- Confidence trick
- Fake memoir
- Fool's errand, a type of practical joke where a newcomer to a group, typically in a workplace context, is given an impossible or nonsensical task by older or more experienced members of the group.
- List of conspiracy theories
- List of common misconceptions
- List of fictitious people, people it was claimed really existed, unlike fictional characters
- List of hoax commemorative plaques
- List of religious hoaxes
- List of scholarly publishing hoaxes
- Literary forgery
- Lost Dutchman's Gold Mine, alleged location of hidden treasure
- Misery literature
- Mummy forgeries
- Oak Island, alleged location of hidden treasure
- Platypus, an animal some European scientists initially believed was a hoax before additional specimens were examined
- Trap street, a common hoax of exposure consisting of a fictitious street deliberately included on a copyrighted map to expose plagiarists
- Wikipedia:List of hoaxes on Wikipedia, a list of hoaxes that occurred on Wikipedia
