= Chen Jin =

Chen Jin is the name of:

- Chen Jin (Viceroy of Liangguang) (1446–1528), Ming dynasty general and official
- Chen Jin (Viceroy of Fujian) (died 1652), general serving the Ming and Qing dynasties, Viceroy of Fujian under the Qing
- Chen Jin (painter) (1907–1998), Taiwanese painter
- Chen Jin (actress) (born 1964), Chinese actress
- Chen Jin (computer scientist) (born 1968), Chinese computer scientist
- Chen Jin (badminton) (born 1986), Chinese badminton player
- Chen Jin (canoeist)
- Gina Jin, also known as Jin Chen, Chinese actress

== See also ==
- Chen Jing (disambiguation)
