= Hongxin =

Chinese semiconductor company

Wuhan Hongxin Semiconductor Manufacturing Co. Ltd. (Hongxin or HSMC) (Chinese 弘芯), a multi-billion chip project backed by the Wuhan government, China, folded in March 2021 when it dismissed all its employees, three years after it opened in 2017. It was viewed as the latest setback to China's semiconductor industry at the time.

== History ==
Hongxi was founded in late 2017 with a projected capitalization of 128 billion yuan ($18.5 billion) to make logic chips using 14 nanometer and 7 nanometer technology and smaller as part of the broader expansion in China's semiconductor industry, driven by China's pursuit of self-sufficiency in critical technology areas due to tensions with the United States.

In November 2019, a local court suspended Hongxin's right to use the land for manufacturing facilities due to a dispute with one of the engineering companies participating in the project.

In late July 2020, a local government report showed Hongxi was facing a major funding shortfall, putting it at risk of coming to a standstill at any moment. The shortfall was 112.3 billion yuan of the originally planned 128 billion yuan. Hongxin's failure to complete land acquisitions, environmental impact reports and other steps prevented it from being qualified for national government support.

As of November 2020, Hongxi was under the full control of the State Assets Supervision and Administration Commission for the Dongxihu district government in Wuhan.

Hongxin was one of six multibillion-dollar chip projects to fail between 2019 and 2021, including Tacoma Semiconductor Technology Co. Ltd. and Dehuai Semiconductor Technology Co. Ltd, which declared bankruptcy.

== See also ==
- Semiconductor industry in China
- Semiconductor device fabrication
- CHIPS and Science Act
- Hanxin
