= Biden School of Public Policy and Administration =

Public Affairs School of the University of Delaware

Coordinates: 39°40′51″N 75°44′56″W

Joseph R. Biden, Jr. School of Public Policy and Administration
- Other name: Biden School
- Type: Public
- Established: December 11, 2018; 7 years ago
- Parent institution: University of Delaware
- Accreditation: NASPAA
- Dean: Maria P. Aristigueta
- Location: Newark, Delaware, United States
- Website: bidenschool.udel.edu

The Joseph R. Biden, Jr. School of Public Policy and Administration (also branded as the Biden School) is the public policy school of the University of Delaware, located in Newark, Delaware. Previously the College of Urban Affairs and Public Policy, The school was renamed in December 2018 after Joe Biden, then a former Vice President and later the 46th president of the United States.

The school offers three undergraduate programs, six master's programs, an online MPA program, and four doctorate programs. The Master in Public Administration program is accredited by the National Association of School of Public Affairs and Administration (NASPAA) and is also the only MPA program in the state of Delaware to be NASPAA-accredited.

== History ==
On December 11, 2018, at the semi-annual meeting of the University of Delaware Board of Trustees, the university president Dennis Assanis announced the establishment of the Joseph R. Biden, Jr. School of Public Policy and Administration. Biden is an alumnus of the university, having graduated with a bachelor's degree in 1965. The School is the second program on campus named for Biden. In 2017, he founded the university's Biden Institute, a research and policy center whose mission is to make an impact in the fields of women's and civil rights, criminal justice reform, environmental sustainability and economic reform. The Biden Institute will remain a part of the new Biden School.

The Biden School is one of seven schools of public affairs named for U.S. presidents. Funds have been raised for a building on campus to house the program. Some donors to the Biden Presidential Library, a separate entity, have urged that that a modest library be included rather than building a stand alone center.

== Centers ==
The Biden School has six research and public service centers.

- The Biden Institute: In 2017, after completing 8 years as Vice President, Joe Biden launched the Biden Institute at the University of Delaware. Biden had said the university was particularly close to his heart and he had been thinking about what he wanted to do after he left office. He wanted to continue his work on female empowerment, civil liberties, economic opportunity for the middle class and other social issues, so his alma mater was a natural fit.
- Center for Applied Demography and Survey Research (CADSR)
- Center for Community Research and Service (CCRS)
- Center for Energy and Environmental Policy (CEEP)
- Center for Historic Architecture and Design (CHAD)
- Disaster Research Center (DRC)
- Institute for Public Administration (IPA)
- Stavros Niarchos Foundation (SNF) Ithaca Initiative (SNF Ithaca)
