= Zhang Cunren =

Qing dynasty politician (died 1652)

Zhang Cunren (simplified Chinese: 张存仁; traditional Chinese: 張存仁; styled Wanzhen 完真, d. 1652) was a Chinese official during the early Qing dynasty and the first Viceroy of Min-Zhe (under the title Viceroy of Zhe-Min), appointed between 1645 and 1647.

Born during the Ming dynasty, he served as a military commander on the northeastern frontier. He defected to the Qing dynasty in 1631 and was assigned to the Bordered Blue Banner of Han forces. After the Qing forces took over China in 1644, he was appointed Viceroy of Zhejiang and Fujian, as well as Minister of War. During this period, he participated in the Qing dynasty's southward campaigns, arresting and killing Ma Shiying, a leading official of the Southern Ming.

Political offices
Preceded by Office created	Viceroy of Minzhe; 1647–1652	Succeeded by Chen Jin
