= Chen Jing =

Chen Jing or Jing Chen may refer to:

- Chen Jing (table tennis) (born 1968), Chinese/Taiwanese table tennis player
- Chen Jing (ice hockey) (born 1971), Chinese ice hockey player
- Chen Jing (volleyball) (born 1975), Chinese volleyball player
- Chen Jing (athlete) (born 1976), Chinese Olympic athlete
- Chen Jing (engineer) (1935–2024), Chinese engineer, member of the Chinese Academy of Engineering
- Jing (Maggie) Chen, Chinese financial mathematician, professor in the UK

== See also ==
- Chen Jin (disambiguation)
