= Pepsi needle hoax =

Series of product contamination hoaxes in 1993

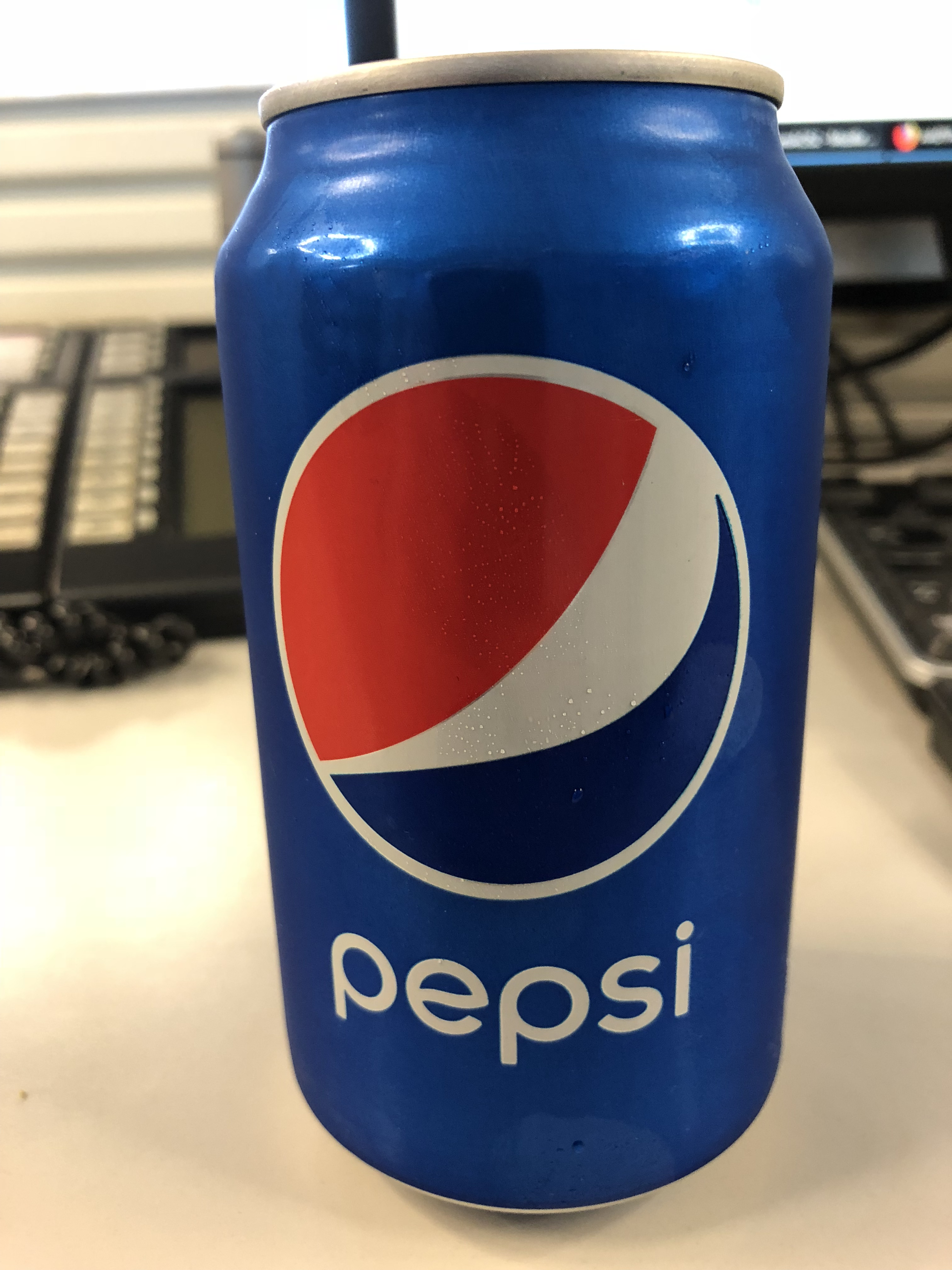
Cans of Pepsi were falsely reported to contain hazards such as needles beginning in 1993.

The Pepsi needle hoax, also called The Great Pepsi hoax, was a series of false claims where members of the public in the United States claimed to find foreign bodies, primarily needles, in cans of Pepsi beginning in June 1993. Occurring only a decade after the Chicago Tylenol murders, and during the rise of urban legends regarding HIV being spread via random needle attacks, the hoax quickly spread and resulted in a major investigation by the Food and Drug Administration and the Federal Bureau of Investigation, leading to numerous prosecutions for false claims.

== Initial incident and spread ==
On June 9, 1993, an 83-year-old man in Tacoma, Washington, reported that he had found a syringe inside a can of Pepsi he had been drinking. After alerting his lawyer, the police and health authorities were contacted leading to headlines in the press. A second report was made the next day, with a woman reporting finding a syringe in a can of Pepsi; however, it was soon discovered that both cans had been produced six months apart and so could not be linked. Soon, reports began occurring nationwide, with many people claiming to have found harmful items—mostly needles, but also razor blades, mysterious blobs, and crack pipes—in Pepsi cans in order to receive compensation. Investigation by the FBI and FDA, as well as by PepsiCo, quickly showed that it would be difficult if not impossible for foreign objects to find their way into soft-drink cans due to the sheer speed and volume with which they are produced on an automated line, along with the fact that the reported contaminated cans came from multiple canning plants months apart from one another.

== Outcome and legacy ==
One of the factors that may have allowed the Pepsi needle hoax to spread so quickly is that social panic around the threat of mysterious needle spiking was commonplace in the United States at the time, due to frequent urban legends that had arisen from the AIDS epidemic of the past decade. In addition, the hoax occurred 11 years after the Chicago Tylenol murders of 1982, a real case of product tampering in which at least seven people were killed and no suspect had ever been caught. Whilst the hoaxes were quickly debunked, and those responsible charged or arrested, the scare caused losses for PepsiCo of $40 million, and required extensive media management in order to regain consumer trust.

== See also ==
- List of hoaxes
