= Genpet =

Genpets are a mixed media installation art piece by artist Adam Brandejs. It is considered a hoax of exposure. The project has been shown in multiple galleries in Canada and Europe and has garnered some attention in the mass media.

The creations were sculpted, automated creatures made of latex and plastic, and housed robotic circuitry to simulate slow respiration. They looked like small, hairless humanoids, and were intended to be displayed as living, but dormant, bio-engineered creatures for purchase as pets. The fabricated packaging indicated a purchaser had a choice of what personality traits their Genpet displayed based on a color-coded chemical behavioral modulation system, and that the creatures had a limited vocal capacity. The sculptures and packaging, along with the professional appearance and cleverly open ended interactive features website led many observers to assume that Genpets were real.

In 2006, Genpets were featured on the weblog for The Museum of Hoaxes in San Diego, California. as well as broadcast on BBC News Worldwide on a BBC programme called Click as well as the Times (UK), the New York Times and G4TechTV.

All the work was hand done by the artist Adam Brandejs, with assistance from makeup artist Crystal Pallister for the coloring of the creatures. The pictures show the actual 19 genpet units that display at art galleries. Genpets have been displayed at multiple Fine Art galleries and museum displays in both North America and Europe.
