= Redcore =

Freeware web browser based on Chromium

Redcore 红芯浏览器

- Redcore on Windows 10
- Developer(s): Redcore Times (Beijing) Technology Ltd. 红芯时代（北京）科技有限公司
- Initial release: 3 August 2018
- Stable release: 49.1.2623.213 / 3 August 2018
- Engines: Blink; WebKit (iOS only)
- Operating system: Microsoft Windows, Android, iOS, Linux
- Size: 398 MB
- Available in: Chinese
- Type: Web browser
- License: Freeware
- Website: browser.redcore.cn

Redcore (Chinese: 红芯浏览器; lit. 'red core browser') is a web browser developed by Chinese company Redcore Times (Beijing) Technology Ltd. based on Chromium and uses the Blink browser engine.

== History ==
On 15 August 2018, Redcore Times (Beijing) Technology Ltd. announced that it had raised 250 million RMB in its series C funding round from venture capital investors, including Morningside Venture Capital, Fortune Venture Capital, and IDG Capital.

At the time of financing, the company marketed Redcore as a "100pc China-developed browser" and claimed that it used the "Redcore" browser engine developed in-house.

On 16 August 2018, after Redcore was revealed to be based on Chromium, Redcore Times (Beijing) Technology Ltd. responded that the project did not solicit state funds in its previous round of funding.

== Controversies ==
=== Chromium plagiarism scandal ===
On 16 August 2018, Chinese social media users disclosed that the Redcore installer, when fully decompressed, contained similar files and directories as the installer for Google Chrome.

After the disclosure, media outlets including Sina accused Redcore of plagiarism and criticized the company for marketing a "Chrome-shell browser" (Chinese: Chrome套壳浏览器) as a domestic product developed completely in-house.

Chen Benfeng, the CEO of Redcore Times (Beijing) Technology Ltd., defended the product by describing three additional features of Redcore that were not present in Google Chrome.

By the end of 16 August, Redcore was no longer available for download from the company's website.

Company co-founder Gao Jing told the China News Service that although the web browser is based on the open-source resources from Chrome, "it still uses domestic core technology and has other innovative elements".

Gao said the browser was removed from the company's website to conduct "urgent technology checks".

On 17 August 2018, Redcore Times (Beijing) Technology Ltd. issued an apology announcement disclosing that Redcore is a browser engine based on Chromium.

== See also ==
- List of hoaxes
- List of web browsers
