= Daniel L. Herrmann Courthouse =

Former courthouse in Wilmington, Delaware

Coordinates: 39.7455°N 75.5463°W

- Interactive map of the Daniel L. Herrmann Courthouse area

General information
- Status: Open
- Type: Courthouse
- Architectural style: Late neoclassical
- Location: 1000 North King Street, Wilmington, DE, Wilmington, Delaware, United States
- Current tenants: Young Conaway Stargatt & Taylor
- Completed: 1916
- Renovated: 1970, 2012

The Daniel L. Herrmann Courthouse is a building in downtown Wilmington, Delaware. Built in 1916, the former courthouse is currently occupied by Young Conaway Stargatt & Taylor, a Wilmington-based law firm.

== History ==
The building was built in 1916 to replace an older courthouse. It was designed to accommodate local courts, the administration of the city of Wilmington, and the administration of New Castle County. It was built in the neoclassical style of architecture, typical of courthouse construction in the period, and was used for many years as Wilmington's courthouse as well as by the city and country governments. It was originally named the Public Building, but was renamed the Daniel L. Herrmann Courthouse in honor of Delaware Supreme Court Chief Justice Daniel L. Herrmann.

In 2002 the court relocated to the New Castle County Courthouse, leaving the Daniel L. Herrmann Courthouse vacant. In 2012, the law firm Young Conaway Stargatt & Taylor became the former courthouse's tenant and renovated the building, adding an outdoor plaza and a parking garage. At the 2024 Millsummit leadership conference, civic leaders from Wilmington discussed the possibility of repurposing the Daniel L. Herrmann Courthouse to serve as the future site of the Joseph R. Biden Jr. Presidential Library.
