= Seriously McDonalds =

Internet hoax

The hoax picture circulated via email and Twitter, suggesting McDonald's had introduced racist policies.

"Seriously McDonalds" is the name under which a viral photograph was spread in the United States in June 2011. The photograph shows a sign, which is in fact a hoax, claiming that McDonald's has implemented a new policy charging African Americans more, as "an insurance measure". Despite having existed for some time, the picture was spread around the Internet, especially on Twitter, in June 2011, by people who were offended or amused by the photograph. McDonald's acted quickly to deny the legitimacy of the sign, but it continued to trend on Twitter under the hashtag "#SeriouslyMcDonalds" and "#seriouslymcdonalds" for a few days. The company's response to the hoax has received praise from journalists and public relations professionals.

== Photograph ==
The photograph shows a sign stuck on what is apparently the window of a McDonald's restaurant with tape. The sign reads:

PLEASE NOTE:

As an insurance measure due in part to a recent string of robberies, African-American customers are now required to pay an additional fee of $1.50 per transaction.

Thank you for your cooperation.

The sign has a footer which says "McDonald's Corporation" and features the McDonald's logo and a helpline number. However, the helpline number actually connects to the KFC Customer Satisfaction Hotline. The picture is a hoax; McDonald's has no such policy.

== History ==
=== Prior to viral status ===
McDonald's had been aware of the image for around a year prior to it trending on Twitter. The McDonald's social media team were not concerned about the photograph, assigning it a low "impact level", as it made claims that the team thought were too outrageous to be believable.

Lauri Apple, writing for gossip website Gawker, reported, attributing the claim to "various sources on the Twitter", that the image was a meme that first surfaced on 4chan some time before it went viral. Apple also linked to a post showing the picture on McServed.com, a blog which mocks both McDonald's and its customers, dated 17 June 2010.

=== Viral ===
In June 2011, the image was picked up by influential Twitter users, with the phrase "Seriously McDonalds" trending on Twitter. The title is meant as an expression of incredulity at the restaurant chain. Kate Linendoll, technology expert for The Early Show, hypothesized that the picture spread from the blog to Twitter, and that Twitter's "immediacy" allowed the image to go viral "so fast it got out of control".

=== Response from McDonald's ===
McDonald's responded to the hoax on 11 June by tweeting "That pic is a senseless & ignorant hoax. McD's values ALL our customers. Diversity runs deep in our culture on both sides of the counter." Despite McDonald's denial, the speed at which the picture spread was increased. McDonald's reiterated their earlier message, tweeting "That Seriously McDonalds picture is a hoax". The photograph became the most highly trending topic over the weekend of the 11–12 June, being spread under the hashtags "#SeriouslyMcDonalds" and "#seriouslymcdonalds". The tag was reportedly used some 20 times per-second over the course of the weekend. The picture was eventually removed from Twitpic, and the speed at which it was spreading declined.

Little damage was done by the hoax, which, in addition to McDonald's response, was revealed through Twitter users' own investigations. The image is no longer well known or remembered, due to, according to public relations professional Ann Marie van den Hurk, McDonald's effective response to the image.

== Analysis ==
Linendoll praised McDonald’s handling of the controversy, arguing that large corporations facing viral criticism should formulate a response immediately and address the issue through the same social-media platform on which the criticism originated. She emphasized the importance of responding in real time and characterized McDonald’s response on Twitter as "well-handled."

Christopher Barger of Forbes described McDonald's response as "a textbook statement on how to respond to a rumor in 140 characters", although he felt they could have personalized responses and used other social networks. Van den Hurk also presented the response from McDonald's as an example of how organizations can best deal with social media crises.

== See also ==
- List of hoaxes
- McDonald's urban legends
