= Chen Zilong =

Chinese poet, essayist and official

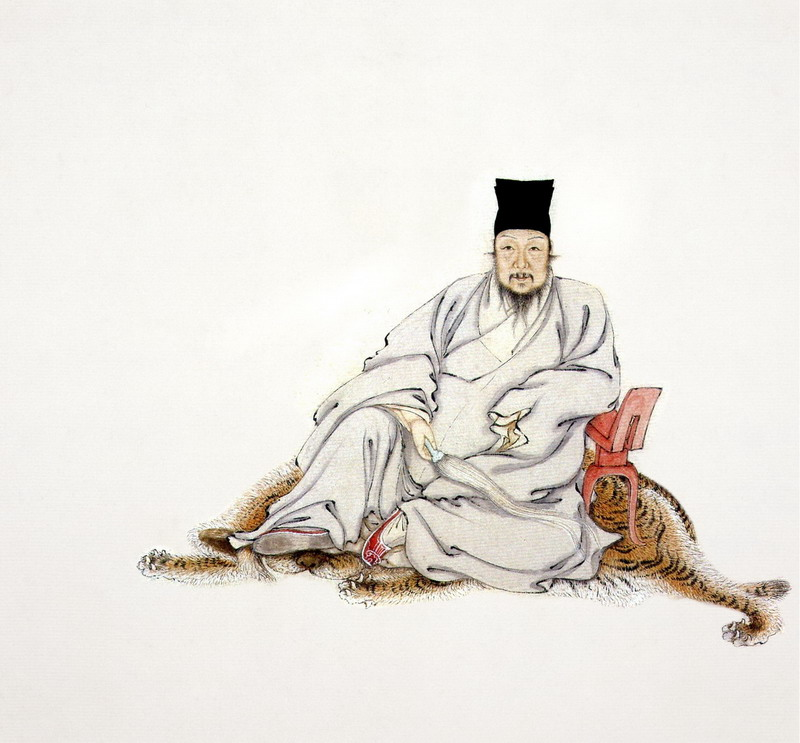
- Born: 1608
- Died: 1647 (aged 38–39)
- Occupations: Poet, essayist, official
- Writing career
- Period: Late Ming dynasty and early Qing dynasty

Chen Zilong (simplified Chinese: 陈子龙; traditional Chinese: 陳子龍; pinyin: Chén Zilong; 1608 – 1647) was a Chinese poet, essayist and official active during the late Ming dynasty and early Qing dynasty.

== Career ==
In 1630, while in Beijing, Chen was introduced to an elderly Xu Guangqi, who shared that he had been working on an agricultural treatise. In 1635 — some two years after Xu's death — Chen returned to his hometown in Songjiang District and thereafter received the final draft of Xu's work from Xu's grandson Erjue. Four years later, Chen presented his "worked-over" version of Xu's manuscript to Nanjing governor Zhang Guowei and Songjiang prefect Fang Yuegong, both of whom pledged to assist with the book's publication once Chen was done editing it. Aided by some of Xu's grandchildren and fellow scholars from Songjiang, Chen undertook most of the editing and added "20 per cent" new material, including passages from later works as Zhang Guowei's Shuili quanshu (1639), Xu's earlier agricultural writing, and Chen's own opinions on Xu's writing. Chen titled the completed work Nong zhen quan shu (農政全書), a "faithful mirror" of Xu's goal of improving the country's agricultural infrastructure, and it was presented to the Chongzhen Emperor in 1641. According to Frederic Wakeman, this was the "first compilation of statecraft writing" in China.

Chen Zilong was an accomplished poet known for exchanging verses with his "partner in poetry", the courtesan Liu Rushi. He was popularly regarded by his contemporaries as one of the "Three Men of Yun Jian", alongside fellow Songjiang poets Li Wen and Song Zhengyu. Chen also mentored the young prodigy Xia Wanchun. Although he started out writing romantic ci, Chen's later work largely comprised emotionally intense loyalist poems. Echoing Yang Shen, Chen found the prevailing composition style which had been inherited from the Song and Tang traditions to be like "overcooked food". Whereas his peers like Qian Qianyi and Ai Nanying preferred what they considered a "bold and straightforward" style, Chen argued that the "archaic and abstruse forms of the medieval period" were superior. These two camps thus were constantly engaged in "sharp debate" on the topic. Reacting to the social upheaval in the late Ming dynasty, Chen also believed that poetry that was wen rou dun hou (温柔敦厚; moderate and mellow) would truly save the country and "usher in a vital and peaceful age".

In his later years, Chen also served as prefectural judge who was against renewed investment in Chinese mining as well as a strong coin currency.

== Personal life and death ==
Historian Chen Yinke wrote that Chen Zilong and Liu Rushi were once in love.

Chen was a member of the reformist Restoration Society (復社) and "consciously modeled" himself after the Song dynasty loyalist poet Wen Tianxiang. He was also influenced by the scholar Liu Zongzhou, whom he believed could compel the Nanjing government into better defending the country from the Manchu invaders. However, Chen Zilong was captured by the Qing military commander Chen Jin, and the Ming dynasty fell. Faced with the threat of being questioned by the Qing authorities for his loyalist activities, Chen Zilong committed suicide by drowning in 1647.

The Qianlong Emperor gave Chen Zilong the posthumous name Zhongyu (忠裕).
