= Young Conaway Stargatt & Taylor =

American law practice in Delaware

Young Conaway Stargatt & Taylor, LLP
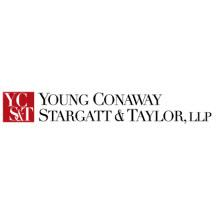
- Headquarters: Wilmington, Delaware
- No. of offices: 3
- Offices: Wilmington, Delaware New York City, New York
- Major practice areas: Bankruptcy law, Restructuring Law, Corporate law, Labor & Employment law
- Date founded: 1959
- Founder: Hy Young, H. James Conaway Jr., Bruce M. Stargatt and William F. Taylor
- Company type: Limited liability partnership
- Website: http://www.youngconaway.com

Young Conaway Stargatt & Taylor, LLP (YCST) is an American law practice based in Wilmington, Delaware. YCST is the second largest law firm in the state of Delaware, and provides legal services to a number of local and international clients. In 2014 YCST was ranked by Chambers USA legal organization as a national leader in the legal profession. From 2011 to 2015 it represented Jay Miscovich during the Miscovich Emeralds Hoax. The law firm notably served as the now-defunct Kodak's legal counsel during the camera company's bankruptcy proceedings and longstanding patent disputes with Apple.

== History ==
Young Conaway Stargatt & Taylor was founded in Wilmington, Delaware in 1959 by Hy Young, H. James Conaway Jr., Bruce M. Stargatt and William F. Taylor.

In 2012 the firm relocated to the former Daniel L. Herrmann Courthouse.

== Notable partners ==
- Kathaleen McCormick - appointed to the expanded Delaware Court of Chancery as a Vice Chancellor in 2018, and elevated to Chancellor in 2021.
