= Fortune Venture Capital =

China-based investment firm

Fortune Venture Capital Co.Ltd.
- Native name: 達晨財智創業投資管理有限公司
- Company type: State-owned enterprise
- Industry: Venture Capital
- Founded: 19 April 2000; 26 years ago
- Founders: Liu Zhou
- Headquarters: Shenzhen, Guangdong, China
- Key people: Liu Zhou (Chairman)
- AUM: US$7 billion (2023)
- Owner: Hunan Broadcasting System
- Parent: Hunan TV & Broadcast Intermediary Co Ltd
- Website: www.fortunevc.com

Fortune Venture Capital (also known as Fortune Capital) (Chinese: 達晨財智; pinyin: Dáchén Cáizhì) is a state-backed Chinese venture capital firm founded in 2000. The firm is owned by the Hunan TV & Broadcast Intermediary Co Ltd which in turn is owned by the Hunan Broadcasting System. It is considered one of the earliest state-backed venture capital firms in China.

== Background ==
Fortune Venture Capital was founded in 2000 by Liu Zhou. Liu first saw the potential of venture capital when the company he worked for, Hunan TV & Broadcast held its initial public offering on the Shenzhen Stock Exchange in 1999. In 2000, Long Qiuyun, the chairman Hunan TV & Broadcast gave Liu 100 million yuan to start a venture capital firm. At the time, Liu was unsure whether to open the firm in Beijing or Shenzhen so he asked a Feng shui master who told him to pick Shenzhen. However Liu has stated he already decided with Shenzhen from the beginning because it was the frontier of reform and opening up.

In the first ten years, the firm struggled. From 2001 to 2005, the firm had been losing money. Of the 196 companies the firm invested in, only 10 were in operation by 2005. During this period, the firm tried to make investments outside venture capital including the disposal of non-performing loans and real estate development As a result, every time Liu returned to Hunan to attend meetings of Hunan TV & Broadcast, he was criticised for the poor performance of the firm. Some even suggested moving the headquarters back to Changsha to save cost or closing the firm down all together.

The first real success of the firm came when it bought a 10% stake in Coship Electronics which went public on small and medium-sized enterprise board of the Shenzhen Stock Exchange in June 2006.

In 2009, Hunan TV & Broadcast revised its articles of association making Fortune Venture Capital the main business of the company. Fortune Venture Capital was the largest source of profit for the company.

In January 2017, Hunan TV & Broadcast approved a deal to allow the management team at Fortune Venture Capital to acquire a 20% stake in the firm. This was done retain talent as the firm's employee compensation was less than that of other private venture capital firms. The deal raised questions on whether the firm was valued properly.

The firm has a strict investment model. Before giving any money to companies, Liu insists on meeting more than 90 percent of a company's shareholders and management, and examine at least seven of its departments. In addition he would meet four or more of a company's clients, and look into at least three of its direct competitors.

Fortune Venture Capital has enjoyed numerous benefits because of its government affiliation. The Shenzhen Guidance Fund has invested into the firm's funds.

Notable investments of the firm include BlueFocus Communication Group, Wangsu Science & Technology and Redcore.
