= Mars hoax email =

Hoax claim about visibility of the planet Mars

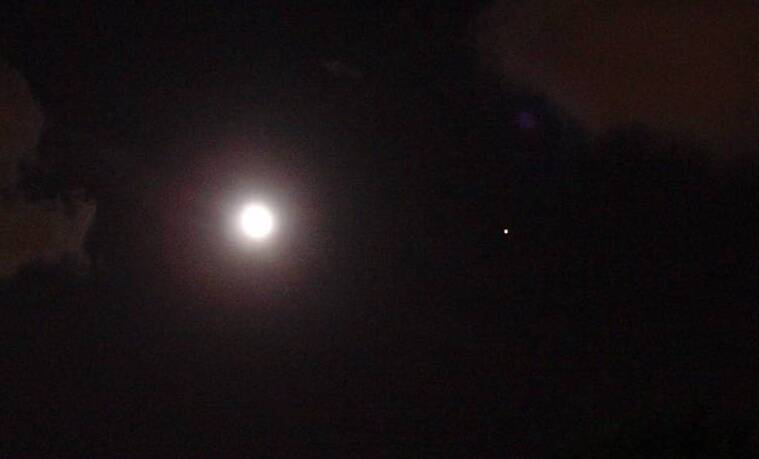
The Moon and Mars as seen in the sky on August 27 2005, showing Mars to be much smaller.

A hoax circulated by email in 2003 claimed that Mars would look as large as the full Moon to the naked eye on August 27 of that year. The hoax has since resurfaced each time before Mars is at its closest to Earth, about every 26 months.

It began from a misinterpretation and exaggeration of a sentence in an email message that reported the close approach between Mars and the Earth in August 2003. At that time, the distance between the two planets was about 55,758,000 kilometres (34,646,000 mi), which was the closest distance between them since September 24, 57,617 BC, when the distance has been calculated to have been about 55,718,000 kilometres (34,622,000 mi).

== Background ==
Both Earth and Mars are in elliptical orbits around the Sun in approximately the same plane. By the nature of the laws of physics, the distance between them varies periodically from a minimum equal to the distance between their orbits at some point along them, to a maximum when they are on opposite sides of the Sun. These minimum (opposition) and maximum distances vary considerably as the two planets progress along their elliptical orbits, and occur about every 780 days. Mars was closer to the Earth in August 2003 (at the opposition) than it had been since 57,617 BC, and than it will be until 2287.

There was another opposition on 30 October 2005, but with a minimum distance about 25% greater than in 2003 (as reported in the original email) and apparent diameter correspondingly smaller. The magnitude was −2.3, about 60% as bright as 2003. (The Moon has an apparent diameter of around 30 minutes of arc, i.e., 1800 arcseconds, with magnitude of about −12.7 when full, about 9,000 times brighter than Mars in the 2003 approach.)

== Origin ==
The Mars hoax originated from an email message in 2003, sometimes titled "Mars Spectacular", with images of Mars and the full moon side by side:

The Red Planet is about to be spectacular! This month and next, Earth is catching up with Mars in an encounter that will culminate in the closest approach between the two planets in recorded history. The next time Mars may come this close is in 2287. Due to the way Jupiter's gravity tugs on Mars and perturbs its orbit, astronomers can only be certain that Mars has not come this close to Earth in the Last 5,000 years, but it may be as long as 60,000 years before it happens again.

The encounter will culminate on August 27th when Mars comes to within 34,649,589 miles (55,763,108 km) of Earth and will be (next to the moon) the brightest object in the night sky. It will attain a magnitude of – 2.9 and will appear 25.11 arc seconds wide. At a modest 75-power magnification
Mars will look as large as the full moon to the naked eye. Mars will be easy to spot. At the beginning of August it will rise in the east at 10 p.m. and reach its azimuth at about 3:00 a.m.

By the end of August when the two planets are closest, Mars will rise at nightfall and reach its highest point in the sky at 12:30 a.m. That's pretty convenient to see something that no human being has seen in recorded history. So, mark your calendar at the beginning of August to see Mars grow progressively brighter and brighter throughout the month. Share this with your children and grandchildren. NO ONE ALIVE TODAY WILL EVER SEE THIS AGAIN

Although the e-mail itself is correct except for the statement that "it may be as long as 60,000 years before it happens again" (in fact, Mars will definitely come closer in 2287), the hoax stemmed from a misinterpretation of the sentence "At a modest 75-power magnification Mars will look as large as the full moon to the naked eye". The message was often quoted with a line break in the middle of this sentence, leading some readers to mistakenly believe that "Mars will look as large as the full moon to the naked eye" when, in reality, this sentence means that Mars enlarged 75 times will look as big as the moon unenlarged.

Mars, normally never more than a dot in the night sky, could not suddenly become visibly large due to normal variations in orbit. If Mars did appear as large as the moon it would be so close that it would cause tidal and gravitational effects—Mars has about twice the diameter of the Moon, and hence would be about twice as far away for the same apparent size. It has nine times the mass of the Moon, and would have about the same tidal effect (nine times the larger mass divided by relative distance cubed).

== Resurfacing ==
The hoax has resurfaced a number of times since 2003, often showing an altered image of twin moons over the Nilov Monastery, and may continue to do so, always announcing an imminent close Earth–Mars approach. The content of the original email, although almost entirely correct for August 27, 2003, has falsely been redated to announce a new close Earth–Mars approach—the real close approach was in 2003 only—also misinterpreting the original email by saying that Mars will look as large as the Moon. The later emails are incorrect, as Mars will not come as close to Earth as it did in 2003 until August 28, 2287.

== See also ==
- List of hoaxes
