= Trodmore Racecourse =

Fictitious racecourse used in a scam

Trodmore Racecourse was the name of a fictitious racecourse, supposedly in Cornwall. On 1 August 1898 it was the subject of an elaborate punting scam.

A man named Mr. Martin contacted the offices of a leading newspaper, The Sportsman, to inform them of a horse racing meeting he was holding the following day in the village of Trodmore. They were so impressed with the quality of the racecard that they promised to publish the runners, riders and results.

Punters placed bets with several bookmakers, and collected as usual when results came through. Everything seemed to be going to plan until another leading newspaper, The Sporting Life, noticed that they had not been informed.

They did not want to be left out, so they copied the results 24 hours later, but there was a slight, but important, difference in the sets of results: one winning horse was given at 5–1 in the Sportsman, but at only 5–2 in the Sporting Life.

Both newspapers, wanting to know the correct odds, attempted to contact the racecourse, and after they could not be contacted, notified police, who commenced a fraud investigation after Trodmore was nowhere to be found on any map of Cornwall. Those behind the scam were estimated to have made £100,000.

Nobody was ever caught for the scam.
