= Hunting for Bambi =

2003 video series

Hunting for Bambi is a series of hoax videos publicized in the summer of 2003 that center on a fictional competition to hunt semi-naked women with paintball guns in the deserts of Las Vegas. Created by Florida resident Michael Burdick, Hunting for Bambi drew significant controversy and media coverage, due both to its perceived misogyny and to Burdick's repeated public statements that it was not a hoax (he later retracted these statements when faced with the possibility of prosecution).

The premise of Hunting is that (male) hunters would pay $5,000–$10,000 for the privilege of hunting "Bambis" (women wearing nothing but a thong and tennis shoes), by picking them off with paintballs powerful enough to draw blood. The Bambis are paid $2,500 if they avoid getting hit and $1,000 even if they do get hit.

The videos, which were done in the style of a reality show, were entirely staged: both the hunts and the paintball hits were carefully planned, and the hunters were hired by Burdick.
