= Cornelis Poortman =

Dutch colonial official

Cornelis Poortman (Born: Rotterdam, Netherlands, 29-09-1873; died: Rijswijk, Netherlands, 16-8-1951) otherwise known as resident Poortman was a colonial Dutch official in the Dutch East Indies. The existence of this figure in history is still controversial.

== Life ==
The life is Poortman is mentioned by Mangaraja Onggang Parlindungan in his work titled Tuanku Rao. He mentioned that Poortman studied Indology at Delft and was later appointed as the Administrative Cadet in the Netherland Indies and was assigned to Tapaktuan in North Sumatra. In 1904 he was appointed as Controleur in Sipirok, then became Resident in Jambi, and finally he became Acting Adviser in the Native Affairs department in Batavia. In 1914–1918 Poortman studied Chinese language and in 1928 managed to gain access to Chinese language documents at Sam Po Kong Temple, Semarang. In 1930 he retired. In the period 1930–1940 he carried out his research in Holland, especially in the field of Batak history, and had documents in Amsterdam which he brought back home in Voorburg. In 1951 he died in the Netherlands.

== Controversy ==
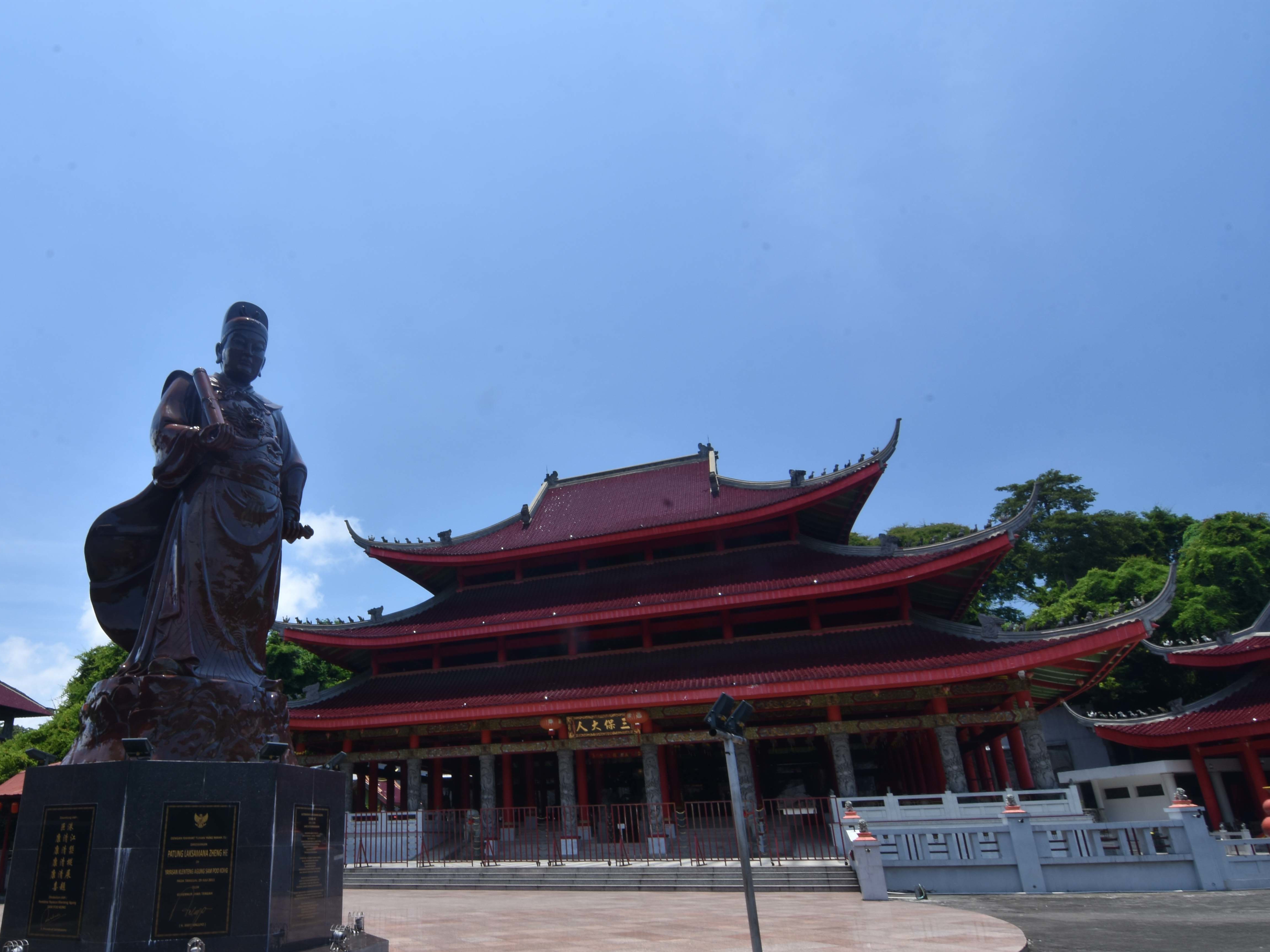
The Sam Po Kong temple and the statue of admiral Zheng He.

As written by Parlindungan, Poortman led a search of the Sam Po Kong Temple in Semarang and transported the Chinese language manuscripts there, some of which were 400 years old at the time, needing as much as 3 cikar (carts drawn by oxen), in 1928 in the framework of the task assigned by the colonial government Dutch to investigate whether Raden Patah was a Chinese or not. Although his existence has not really been able to be proven, or whether it is another person but is in the same position at that time, Mangaraja Onggang Parlindungan has quoted many of Poortman's alleged life story in his book Tuanku Rao, which was later cited frequently by Slamet Muljana in his book Runtuhnya Kerajaan Hindu-Jawa dan Timbulnya Negara-Negara Islam di Nusantara (The Collapse of the Hindu-Javanese Empire and the Emergence of Islamic Countries in the Archipelago) and in other analysis.

Ricklefs claims that search attempts by Dutch scholars to identify Poortman were fruitless. Poortman should have been a fairly high-ranking person, and considering there are also claims that he was a student of Snouck Hurgronje and teacher of van Leur. Poortman's existence and the story told by Parlindungan is still speculative, and perhaps imaginative.

== Chinese texts ==
There are 2 Chinese texts/chronicles that allegedly brought by Poortman from the Chinese temple, namely:

=== Semarang Chinese Chronicles ===
Also known as Malay Annals of Semarang, this one has received a lot of attention: The text contains several references to a man named Gan Eng Cu, who is identified as the “Captain of Chinese Islam” from Tuban. Supposed to be appointed to this position in 1423 by a person named Bong Tak Keng (identified by the text as the person Zheng He appointed to be governor of the Chinese Muslim Community in Java), the text also claims that, in 1436, Gan Eng Cu was sent to China as a messenger of Majapahit.

There are many problems surrounding the Semarang Chinese Chronicle which have a very high level of problem. For example, the passage of text centered around the Demak revival is very similar to the narrative found in Babad Tanah Jawi. Both sources, for example, named the first ruler of Demak "Jinbun" and describe him as the son of the last ruler of Majapahit, identified as Kerta Bumi in the Chinese Chronicle of Semarang and Prabu Brawijaya in Babad Tanah Jawi. As in Babad Tanah Jawi, the Chinese Chronicle of Semarang also claims that Jinbun originally lived in Palembang where, along with his younger brother, he was raised by the city governor. In the Semarang Chinese Chronicle, the latter is identified with a Chinese Muslim named Swan Liong, while Babad Tanah Jawi claims to be a Javanese Hindu prince called Arya Damar. However, both sources claim that, after living in Palembang for some time, Jinbun and his younger brother returned to Java. Jinbun established himself in Demak (Chinese Chronicle Semarang claims he ruled from 1475 to 1518, while Babad Tanah Jawi does not contain the date) and his brother went to Majapahit. According to these two sources, Jinbun later spread his influence throughout Java. The Semarang Chinese chronicle claims he proceeded to subdue Majapahit twice, once in 1478 and again in 1517, before finally destroying it in 1527.

The use of Chinese names by the Semarang Chinese Chronicle also confuses the narrative aspect. Not only were most of these names absent from other sources, they were not translated from Chinese either. On the other hand, and as Russell Jones points out, their transcription appears to be in the Hokkien dialect, thus changing "Sam Boa" to "San Po Bo", "Ma Huan" to "Mah Hwang" and "Fei Xin" to "Fen Tsin". As pointed out by Jones, the Semarang Chinese Chronicle provides definitions for three Chinese names: Jin Bun is translated as "strong man". Swan Liong as "diamond dragon" and Kin San as "Gold Mountain". According to Jones, in Hokkien the last two definitions are correct. "Jin Bun", although jin means "person", it has no meaning in either Hokkien or any other Chinese dialect. The inconsistencies may reflect the fact that it is a Chinese name that has been adapted over time into Javanese. If so, their presence among understandable (i.e. non-adapted) Chinese names indicates that not all of these names underwent the same history of change. This may indicate that, initially, they did not come from the same source and were recently put together.

The Chinese Chronicle of Semarang's depiction of the process by which the Chinese community in Java lost their Muslim identity due to their isolation from China is another strange thing. Following Zheng He's resignation from the region in the early 1430s, followed by a Chinese ban on all international trade that lasted until 1567, the remaining Chinese Muslim community in Java would experience a period of separation from their homeland. In these circumstances, there may have been a loss of their Chinese identity, accompanied by acculturation. But it is unlikely that this situation will lead to a decline in Islamic identity: During the latter part of the fifteenth and early sixteenth centuries (when this decline was thought to have occurred), Java was experiencing rapid Islamization and the creation of a thriving Javanese Islamic culture. Abundant opportunities will therefore exist to meet and interact with Muslims. It would make no sense to be the Chinese Chronicle of Semarang claiming that the loss of Muslim identity by this community had been compensated for due to the adoption of Chinese customs (i.e. the mosque became an ancestral shrine). Retreat to traditional Chinese customs — essentially a form of Sinicization would imply a closer connection to China.

With the above considerations, it can be seen that the Chinese Chronicle of Semarang uses an unreliable tradition, ignores more accurate traditions, and has the characteristics of a modern writer. In the context of its difficult origins, this suggests the chronicle may be fabricated / fake.

=== Cirebon Chinese Chronicles ===
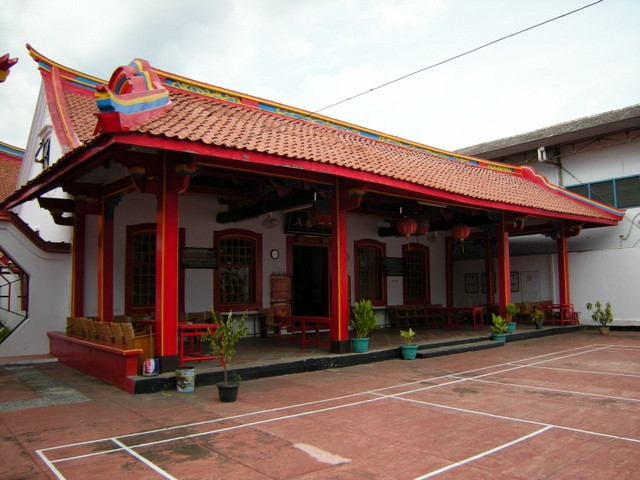
Talang temple in Cirebon.

Also known as Malay Annals of Cirebon. This chronicle is found in the Talang temple, Cirebon. The problem with this manuscript is that, although the people around the Talang temple currently know about the Cirebon Chinese Chronicle through Slamet Muljana's work, they have no memory of the original manuscript. Since Poortman was active 90 years ago, this may not be surprising or damning; the manuscript is unlikely to be seen or read by members of the temple community at this time. But this is not the only problem.

Talang temple is a traditional Chinese temple dedicated to its builder (ancestor worship), Tan Sam Tjai. According to the Cirebon Chinese chronicle, Tan Sam Cai was a Chinese Muslim court official who renounced his faith, worshiping at Pura Talang (according to the text, the temple was originally a mosque built in 1415 but was later converted into a temple). Records regarding the construction of the temple confirm this, it was a Chinese royal official who converted to Islam before leaving it and re-embracing the original Chinese teachings, but unlike the Cirebon Chinese Chronicle, the record claims that it was Tan Sam Tjai who originally founded the Talang temple as a mosque, before later re-opening it as an ancestral temple, which the Chinese community later honored after his death. In addition, the tomb of the non-Muslim Tan Sam Tjai is still in town, accompanied by a trilingual plaque (Chinese-Malay-Javanese) confirming Tan Sam Tjai as a court official, earning him the title Raden Aria Wira Tidela. However, this plaque is dated 1765. This year's difference is significant, the structure of the temple is also similar to that of a late 18th century temple.

Many of the problems of the Semarang Chinese Chronicle are repeated in this chronicle. For example, although there are possible Javanese claims that Zheng He's fleet visited Cirebon, there are no Chinese records for this incident. Likewise, the Cirebon Chinese Chronicle ends with Pajang's conquest of Demak, again implying the end of one period and the beginning of another — a periodization similar to a modern history book. There is also a similar illogical depiction (Sinicization — the return of Muslim Chinese to the Chinese faith, as a result of isolation from China after Zheng He's time). Those points point in the direction of forgery.

Cirebon Chinese Chronicle is almost certainly not based on a genuine parallel tradition: the Talang Temple community has no independent memory of the Cirebon Chinese Chronicle, Tan Sam Tjai's reporting of the text is flawed, the historical periodization suggests a modern writer, and its origins remain uncertain. These points suggest that the Cirebon Chinese Chronicle is a hybridization of the two earlier texts (perhaps done in modern times).
