= Chen Jin (Viceroy of Fujian) =

Chinese military commander (died 1652)

Chen Jin (simplified Chinese: 陈锦; traditional Chinese: 陳錦; died 1652) was a military commander and official of the late Ming dynasty and early Qing dynasty. He served as Viceroy of Min-Zhe between 1647 and 1652.

During the Ming dynasty, Chen Jin was stationed along the Liaodong frontier, and in 1633 he defected to the Qing forces and was recommended to Huang Taiji. After the Ming-Qing transition, he was appointed commander of Suzhou, where he captured Chen Zilong. He was then appointed as Viceroy of Min-Zhe as a reward. In 1651, he led forces to attack the Zhoushan islands, successfully capturing them.

In 1652, Zheng Chenggong laid siege to Zhangzhou and defeated Chen Jin's forces, forcing him to retreat after abandoning most of his equipment. After he lashed one of his house servants Ku Chengdong (庫成棟), the servant murdered him at night, cut off his head and offered it to Zheng. But Zheng Chenggong later avenged Chen Jin. After Zheng Chenggong rewarded Ku Chengdong, Zheng then murdered Ku Chengdong on the charge of treason.

Political offices
Preceded by Zhang Cunren	Viceroy of Minzhe; 1647–1652	Succeeded by Liu Qingtai
