= Science Femme =

2020 hoax involving cyberbullying in academia

The Science Femme, Woman in STEM was a hoax in which Craig Chapman, a white male university professor, adopted a persona of "Science Femme" for the purpose of engaging in cyberbullying. Science Femme claimed to be a scientist and woman of color who immigrated to the United States after experiencing childhood poverty. Through this persona, Chapman protested Black Lives Matter, used anti-LGBT rhetoric, and sought to disrupt the research and careers of various female scientists. Another commentator remarked on Science Femme's Islamophobic activities. The connection between the two identities was discovered in October 2020. In February 2021, Chapman resigned from his university position.

== Activities ==
The Science Femme Twitter account was created in January 2019. At the time of the hoax discovery in October 2020 it had 19,000 followers. The account operator claimed to have been born into poverty where they slept on a dirt floor. Later they immigrated to the United States and now were a woman of color and professor.

In October 2020, after the discovery of the hoax, various women scientists came forward to share stories of how the account operator sought to disrupt their research or careers.

The local New Hampshire Public Radio described the activities as misogynist, transphobic, and anti-Black Lives Matter. Activities also included redistribution of revenge porn of a politician.

== Discovery ==
In October 2020, The New Hampshire, which is the University of New Hampshire's student newspaper, reported the connection between the Science Femme and professor Craig Chapman teaching chemistry at the university. A month later the newspaper noted that the university's investigation was ongoing.

The chair of the chemistry department confirmed that Chapman and the Science Femme were the same person. Chapman admitted to operating the account.

In February 2021, the university concluded its investigation confirming that the professor's conduct did not meet university expectations. At the same time, Chapman resigned from the university.

== Response ==
Writers for Inside Higher Ed and The Daily Beast described the events as greatly disrupting civil conversation about social problems, as harming women scientists, and being one of several such instances of where white academics pretended to be members of minority communities to the harm of those communities.

Media outlets reflected on the harm of the story of a university professor countering activism at their school.

TheGrio considered the Chapman's activities to be a response to plans for diversity and inclusion initiatives at the University of New Hampshire.

== See also ==
- Academic dishonesty
- BethAnn McLaughlin

== Further consideration ==
- "The Science Femme, Woman in STEM (@piney_the)". Twitter. Archived from the original on 25 February 2021.
- "Craig Chapman". College of Engineering and Physical Sciences. University of New Hampshire. 12 February 2021. Archived from the original on 18 January 2021.
- "Thread by @piney_the: Here it is: I was successful in killing my dept's woke statement on recent social unrest". threadreaderapp.com.
