= Sweden sex competition hoax =

2023 fake news

In June 2023, a hoax was posted online stating that Sweden had officially declared sex a sport and was hosting Europe's first-ever sex competition.

== Spread ==
On various news outlets and social media platforms, news claiming "Sweden Hosting First-Ever Sex Competition" and "Sweden Officially Declares Sex as a Sport" emerged, asserting that Sweden was organizing a sex championship. According to the articles, the competition allegedly included various categories such as "oral sex" and claimed that participants from around the world were gathering in Sweden to compete.

=== Media circulation ===
First report about the sex competition was published by Slovenian news outlet Metropolitan. President of the Swedish Sexual Federation Dragan Bratić gave exclusive interview for Meteopolitan and explained all the rules. The initial reports about the sex competition were published by news outlets such as Marca, Greek City Times, Canadian daily The Beacon Herald, South African media house IOL, Pulse Nigeria, German media house RTL, and Pakistani news websites such as MMnews. Spanish sports daily Marca listed participants' names who would allegedly represent their countries. It reports, "Twenty people from different countries are expected to compete and the winners of the events will be decided by a panel of judges scoring from five to 10 and by popular audiences." It further published another report detailing the rules of the competition without providing any legitimate sources, without proof of such a competition. CNBC TV18 published "details" on how individuals could participate in the event, including an email address linked to the "Swedish Sex Federation." Times of India reported "Sweden will soon host the European sex championship." It detailed the rules of the tournament, and says the Kamasutra will aid the participants.

=== Reactions ===
The misleading article generated significant attention and sparked discussions on social media platforms, where users expressed a range of reactions, from skepticism to curiosity. In response to this now debunked sex competition news, a hacker group from Bangladesh named Mysterious Team Bangladesh, known for their cyber exploits, announced a cyber-attack campaign titled Operation OpSweden, that focuses on inviting other hacker collectives and threat actors to participate in the sex competition.

== Debunking and fact-checking ==
Following the dissemination of the misleading article, several reputable fact-checking sources investigated the claims and debunked them. Outlets such as Reuters, Snopes, Mashable, The Quint, The Local, Deutsche Welle, Hindustan Times, WION, DNA India, Yahoo News, Factly.in, and Newschecker.in published articles discrediting the news.

=== Investigation findings ===
In January 2023, a report published in Göteborgs-Posten, a prominent Swedish-language daily newspaper, highlighted the involvement of a Swedish individual named Dragan Bratic. Bratic, who owns several strip clubs, reportedly pursued the classification of sexual activities as a sport. He submitted an application for membership to the Swedish Sports Confederation, with the intention of establishing a sex federation. The application was rejected by the Confederation in May, saying "we have things to do."

The Swedish Sports Confederation confirmed that an individual who claimed to represent a sex federation had submitted an application for membership. They clarified that the application was not accepted, emphasizing the absence of any affiliation or collaboration with any sex organization. They also made it clear that Sweden has not declared sex as a sport.

Despite the rejection, Bratic's unregistered organization, the "Swedish Sex Federation" (SSF), made an announcement regarding their intention to proceed with a sex championship. Through a written statement provided to DW (Deutsche Welle), the SSF asserted their self-financing of the entire European Championship through independent resources and voluntary efforts. The Swedish Sports Confederation, represented by spokesperson Anna Setzman, denied any involvement or support for the sex organization.

An Indian media outlet associated with CNBC published "details" on how individuals could participate in the event, including an email address linked to the "Swedish Sex Federation." A website bearing the same name does exist, although it redirects to a pornography website. As of June 2023, this website features a countdown for the "tournament" and claims that it will provide live streaming of the event.

Setzman, the spokesperson for the Swedish Sports Confederation, expressed concern regarding the dissemination of false information in the international media. She emphasized that there was no recognized sex federation affiliated with the Swedish Sports Confederation and stated that the apparent intention behind the spread of such misinformation seemed to be aimed at tarnishing the reputation of Swedish sports and Sweden as a whole.

The fact-checking reports highlighted the alleged disappointment by the self-proclaimed Swedish Sex Federation, who claimed to have received no financial support from the Swedish government's allocated funds of 2 billion Swedish kronor, which were designated for registered sports organizations.

== Removal of initial reports ==
Some of the publications have removed the initial reports after it turned out to be a hoax, while some reports from several other outlets such as India Today, The Times of India, Independent Online, Indian news website Latestly, and Marca remain published to this day. Some outlets that published misleading reports, such as Indian news website Firstpost, India TV, and Deccan Herald, also have not corrected their reporting.
