= Monster of Lake Fagua =

Legendary creature of Peru

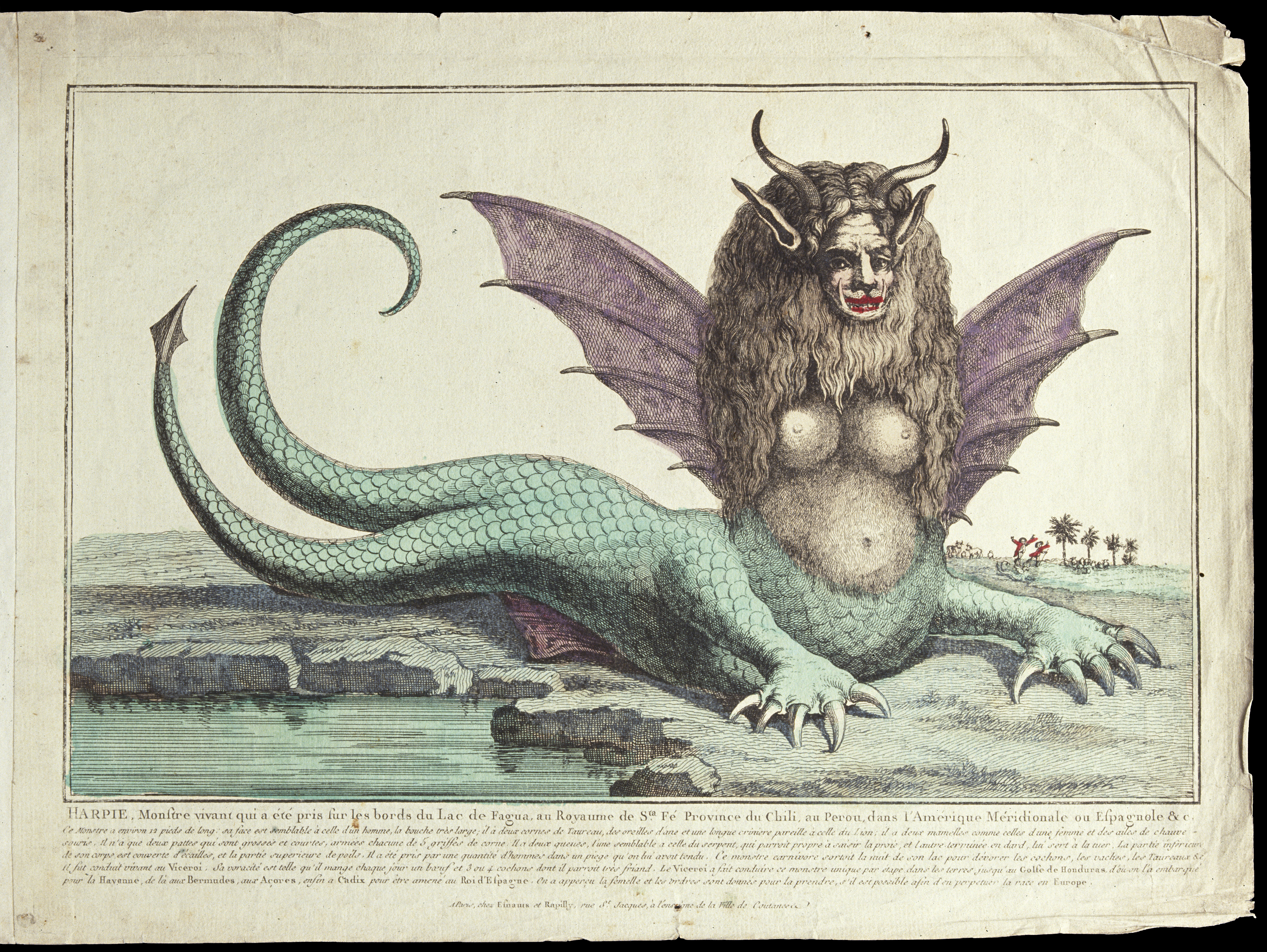
18th century illustration of the monster, describing it as a harpie

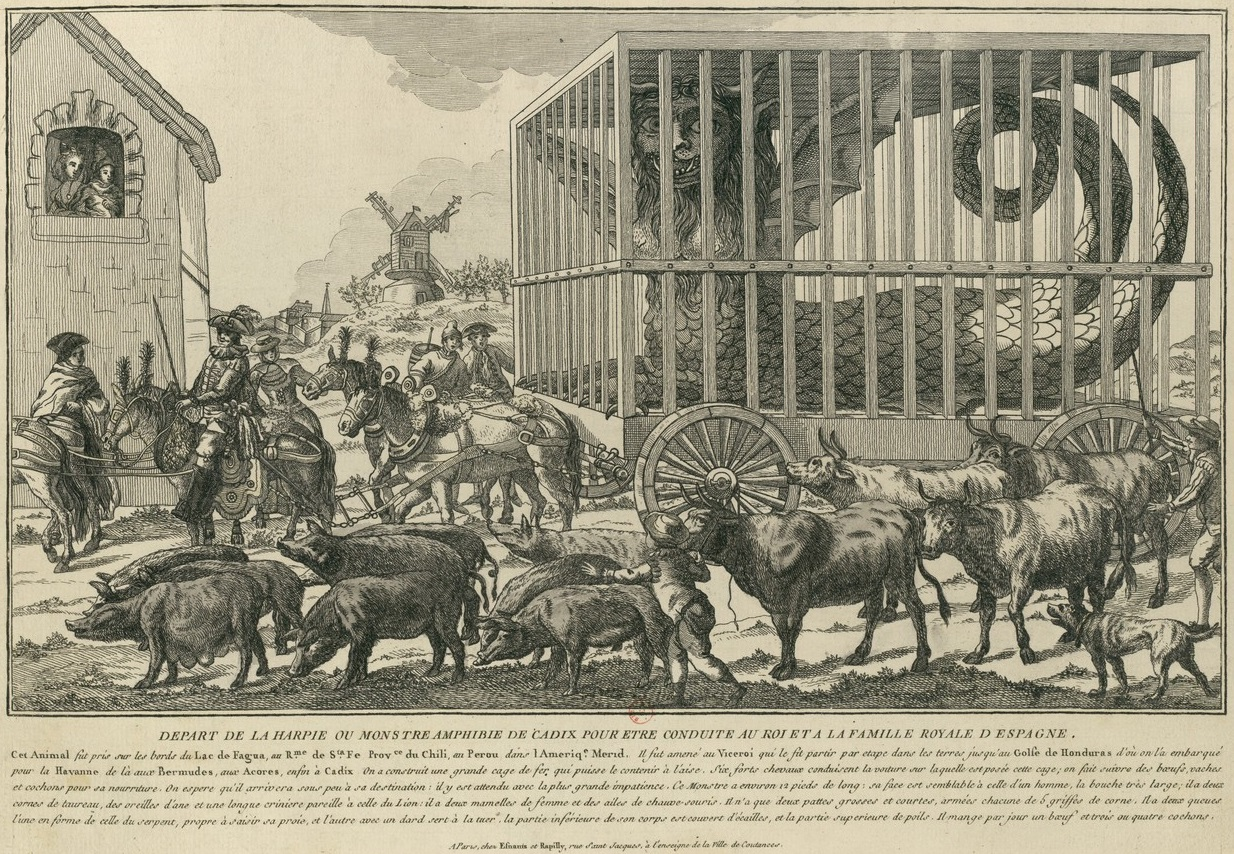
A 1784 depiction of the monster having been captured

The Monster of Lake Fagua is a legendary creature, which it was claimed had been found in a lake near a place called Santa Fe, in Chile. An article about the creature was written in the Courier de L'Europe in France in 1784 stating that it had been captured and was going to be on display in Europe. The creature is described as being 20 feet (6.1 m) long, with a human face, bull-like horns, huge donkey-like ears, lion-like teeth, bat-like wings, and the lower body of a dragon with two long pointed tails which it used to sting and attack enemies. It also attacked using its rings or suckers to grab its prey. It was said to be nocturnal and its diet consisted of livestock, like cattle and pigs.
