= Ma Shiying =

Ming bureaucrat (1596–1647)

- 马士英
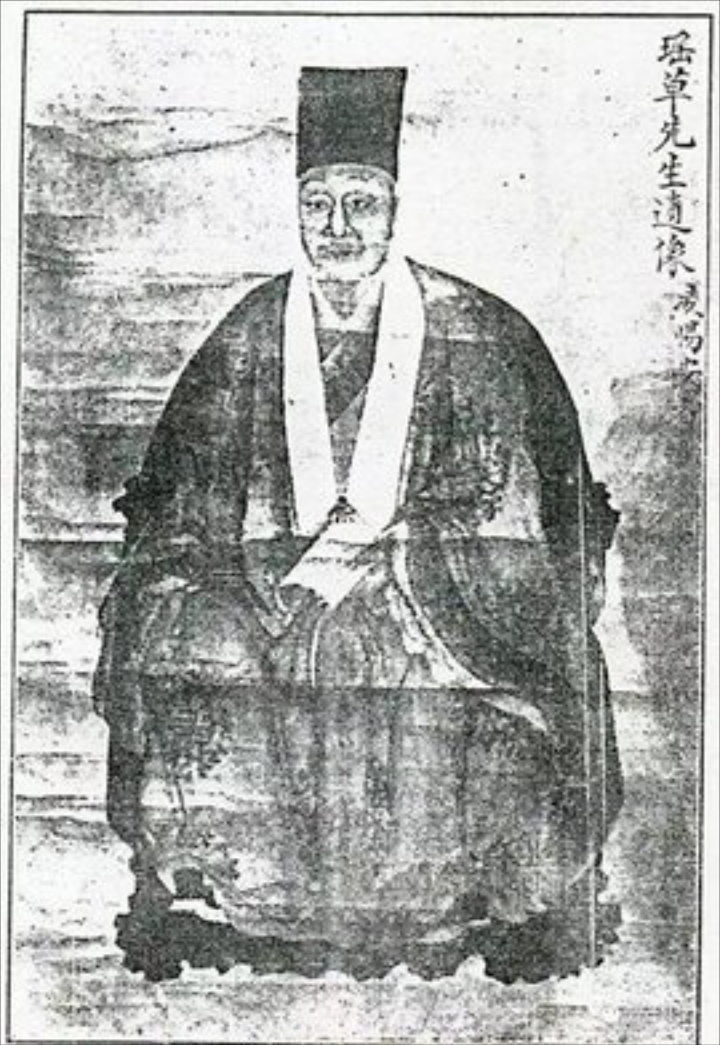

Grand Secretariat of the Eastern Hall
- In office 1644–1645
- Monarch: Hongguang

Minister of War
- In office 1644–1645
- Monarch: Hongguang
- Preceded by: Shi Kefa
- Succeeded by: Lian Guoshi

Minister of War in Southern Capital
- In office 1644
- Monarch: Hongguang
- Preceded by: Shi Kefa
- Succeeded by: Lian Guoshi

Viceroy of Fengyang
- In office 1644–1645
- Monarch: Chongzhen
- Preceded by: Gao Douguang

Personal details
- Born: 1596 Guiyang, Guizhou, Ming dynasty, China
- Died: 1647 (aged 50–51) Lake Tai, Jiangsu, Qing dynasty, China or Yanping, Fujian, Qing Dynasty, China
- Spouse: Lady Zhou
- Occupation: Official

Ma Shiying (1596 – 1647), courtesy names Yaocao and Chongran, was a notorious government official who lived in the late Ming dynasty. He served under the Southern Ming Hongguang regime and was best known for instigating internecine conflict within the court.

== Early life and career ==
Ma Shiying was born in 1596 in Guiyang, Guizhou. He passed the metropolitan examination in 1616 and obtained his Jinshi degree in 1619. In Nanjing, he was made a secretary in the Ministry of Revenue, a ministerial director, and a prefect. In 1631, he was promoted to Right Assistant Censor-in-chief and Grand Coordinator of Xuanfu before being exiled following a corruption trial brought by eunuch Wang Kun. While in Nanjing, he befriended Ruan Dacheng, who had close ties with the Eunuch Faction. With Ruan's help, Ma was recalled and made Viceroy of Fengyang. In the 15th year of the Chongzhen Era (~1642), Ma was made Right Vice Minister of War and Viceroy of Luzhou and Fengzhou.

== Service under Southern Ming ==
When Beijing fell to Li Zicheng on 24 April 1644, it took three weeks for reliable news of the Chongzhen Emperor's suicide to reach Nanjing. Ma Shiying supported the Prince of Fu (the future Hongguang Emperor) as Chongzhen's successor instead of the less popular Prince of Lu. Ma gained the Prince of Fu's support by transporting him to Nanjing and rallying local generals to his side. After entering Nanjing with the Prince on 5 June, Ma was made the de jure Minister of War and Grand Secretary. He was excluded from civil affairs and was left at his post in Fengyang due to his history as a military strategist. He was given de facto power after using a large army and 1200 war junks, successfully pressuring the Hongguang Emperor into assuming the throne on 19 June. Ma was promptly made Grand Preceptor of the Heir Apparent and later Grand Tutor. The following day, Shi Kefa, pressured by Ma's clique, went to Yangzhou to coordinate a defense north of the Yangtze; this caused outside hostility towards the Hongguang regime because Shi was a civil official while Ma was a military one.

While the Southern Ming struggled to pay its troops, it also suffered from internecine conflicts that Ma would quickly become entangled in. He opposed the Pure Element and Donglin factions by creating his own clique around military men and members of the imperial family. The Pure Element faction especially distrusted Ma for his friendship with Ruan Dacheng, who was associated with the infamous eunuch Wei Zhongxian; the Pure Element leader, Liu Zongzhou, even wanted to return Ma to Fengyang on the grounds of insubordination. Ma's elevation of Ruan to multiple high offices in 1644 and 1645 thus attracted many men who were frustrated by the civil factions' dominance over Ming politics. Ma's clique would go on to purge and arrest many of its enemies, particularly those of the Donglin faction. These purges weakened the Southern Ming court by fostering disunity; numerous competent officials defected either to rebels or to the Qing dynasty, which was then sweeping through northern China.

Ma eventually became de facto regent as the Hongguang Emperor withdrew into the inner court. The emperor's expenditures quickly bankrupted the Southern Ming treasury, causing the regime to institute monopolies, levy new taxes, and require bribes for official appointments. The last operation in particular harmed Ma's reputation and the following popular saying developed: "supervisors more numerous than sheep, bureau aides as low as dogs... swept up all of Jiangnan's cash to stuff the mouths of the Family Ma."

== Zuo Liangyu's Eastern Campaign ==
A series of mysteries regarding the Chongzhen Emperor's heir rocked the Hongguang regime in 1645. A young man, later revealed to be Wang Zhiming, impersonated the Chongzhen Emperor's eldest son. The Hongguang Emperor's approval of the imposter, rumors of severe interrogations, and general fanaticism fed into the widespread belief that the imposter was the real heir. Soon after, a woman named Madam Tong was imprisoned in Nanjing after claiming to be the Hongguang Emperor's concubine; rumors of the emperor's sexual debauchery, his mistreatment of Madam Tong, and her death in prison further damaged the regime's reputation. These rumors (alongside fears that Li Zicheng would flee into Huguang) prompted Ming general Zuo Liangyu to march eastwards towards Nanjing on 19 April to "cleanse the surroundings of the ruler." Even though Qing forces under Dodo were by now entering Jiangnan, Ma Shiying considered Zuo's invasion to be a greater threat since the Qing were thought to be appeasable. Ma ordered several Ming commanders north of the Yangtze river to halt Zuo's invasion, weakening Shi Kefa's position. Shi and the rest of Yangzhou would be massacred in May 1645. Zuo's army (now led by his son) would surrender to Qing forces in May near Jiujiang.

== Downfall and death ==
Zhenjiang, a city ~20 miles east of Nanjing, fell to Qing forces on 1 June. The Hongguang Emperor fled to Wuhu on 3 June and Ma Shiying fled towards Hangzhou on 4 June after discovering the emperor's absence, bringing 400 soldiers and supposedly disguising his mother as the Empress Dowager. He was denied refuge by the Prince of Lu and the Prince of Tang and died shortly afterward.

There are multiple theories regarding Ma's death:

1. He was killed by Qing forces near Lake Tai.
2. He tried to escape as a monk but surrendered in Taizhou. He was executed in Yanping after trying to contact the Prince of Tang.
3. He shaved his head in Taizhou before being killed by Qing forces. Legend says that his skin was peeled off and stuffed with grass.

== See also ==
- Transition from Ming to Qing
