= Pan Am Flight 914 =

Hoax about a plane's disappearance

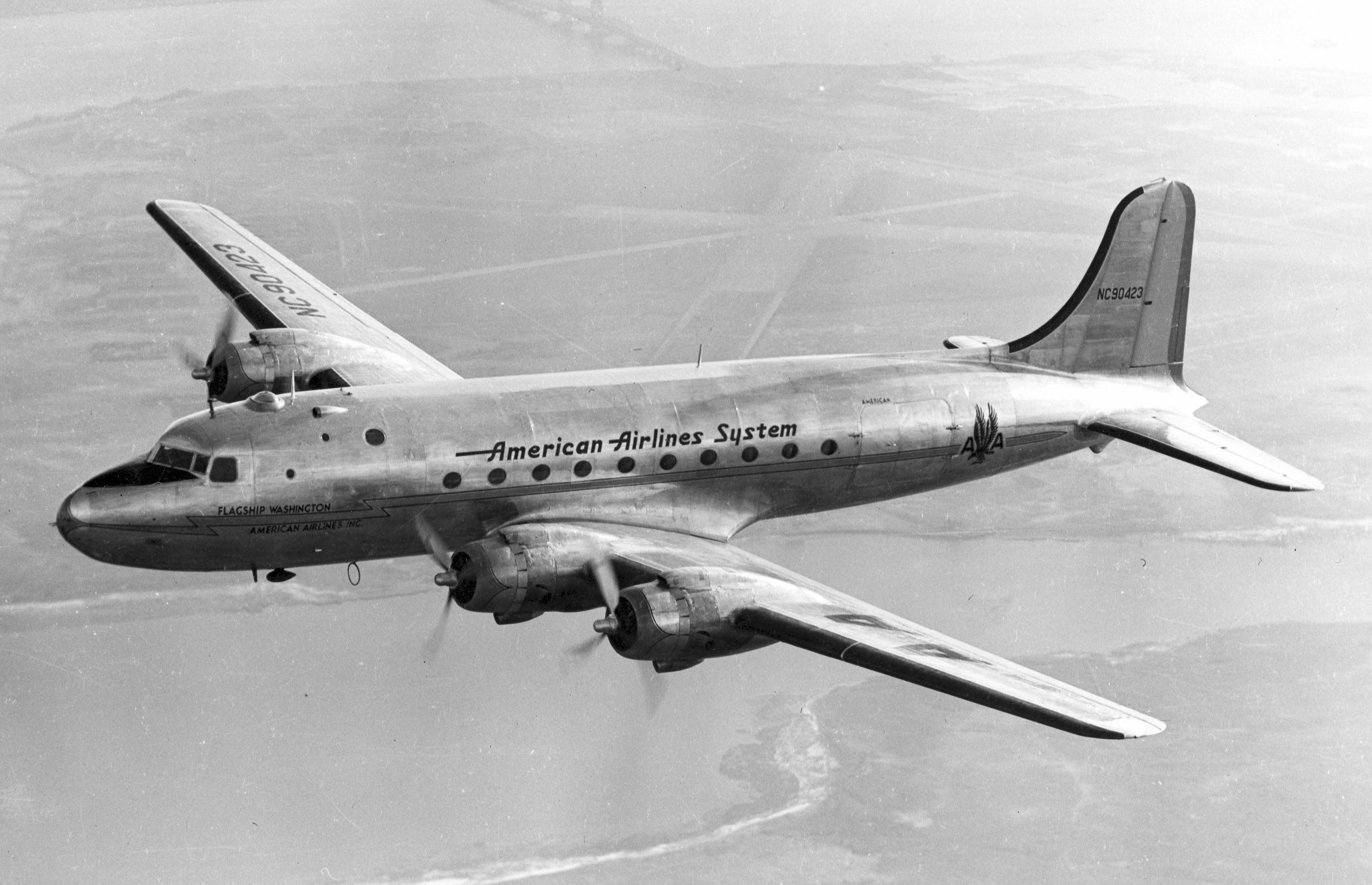
A Douglas DC-4, similar to what was used during the legend.

Pan Am Flight 914 is an urban legend that a Douglas DC-4 disappeared after a takeoff in 1955 and only landed again three decades later.

The legend alleges that a Pan Am Douglas DC-4 with 57 passengers and 5 crew members disappeared from radar without a trace shortly after takeoff on a flight from New York City to Miami on July 2, 1955.

After 37 years (30 in some sources), the plane was sighted again near Caracas, and then after landing at the airport there, the airlines tried to communicate with the pilot, and the pilot said “We just need to arrive in Miami in 9:56.”

After realizing, the plane immediately took off, never to be seen again. In Internet forums, there was speculation, among other things, as to whether it had been a journey through time through a wormhole.

The legend originates from a 1985 article in the Weekly World News, a tabloid known for false stories. The article was re-published in 1993 and 1999. The image of the plane is a stock photo of a Trans World Airlines DC-4. There are no contemporary sources of the incident in the press or the Civil Aeronautics Board accident reports.

There is no indication in any of the full production lists for the DC-4 that such an event took place on any of the 1,244 planes of this type built, including the Pan Am DC-4 piston airliner involved.
