= Miscovich emeralds hoax =

2010 hoax perpetrated by Jay Miscovich

The Miscovich emeralds hoax was an attempt by American businessman and diver Jay Miscovich to pass off modern store-bought emerald gemstones as treasure recovered from the wreck of a 16th-century Spanish galleon. Miscovich's hoax—which involved him planting, rediscovering, and then recovering emeralds—quickly attracted the attention of investors and the marine salvage industry, with a number of lawsuits being filed against Miscovich by entities claiming ownership of the emeralds. The legitimacy of the treasure was later called into question after the recovered emeralds were found to have been coated with a modern epoxy. Miscovich committed suicide in October 2013, and the emeralds used to perpetrate the hoax remain in legal limbo as of 2019.

== Background ==
Joseph "Jay" Miscovich was a Pennsylvania real estate developer, entrepreneur, and novice diver. He was known for investing in unconventional business ventures, such as giving money to treasure hunters and marine salvagers. Notably, Miscovich had been an investor in Motivation Inc., a marine salvage company that had famously found and recovered treasure from the wreck of a 17th-century Spanish Galleon, Nuestra Señora de Atocha, off of Key West. This find further piqued Miscovich's interest in the marine salvage industry, with him later stating in court that “I started realizing that [for] most of these treasure-hunting companies, the real treasure was making money by taking it from their investors,” later adding, “I decided to do it on my own, and decided I could do it better.”

In addition to his investments, Miscovich ran a successful real estate business in his hometown of Latrobe, Pennsylvania. However, the Great Recession of 2008 ruined him financially and left him in debt. Looking for a new career, Miscovich left Pennsylvania for Key West, Florida, where he ingratiated himself with the local diving community. He befriended a local diver, Stephen Elchlepp, with whom he spent months diving on various wrecks looking for valuables.

== Hoax ==
=== Discovery ===
While in Key West in January 2010, Miscovich purchased a map for $500 and a shard of pottery from a man named Mark Cunningham (later revealed to have done work for him in Pennsylvania). The map led him and Elchlepp to a nondescript location off the Florida coast. The site was about forty miles off the coast of Key West in international waters. While nothing was found at the coordinates marked on the map, Miscovich suggested that the two widen their search.

At a location about a mile from the marked site Miscovich and Elchlepp found, among other relics, what they claimed to be hundreds of uncut emeralds scattered on the seabed. According to Miscovich's account of the "find", he picked emeralds off the sea floor "like cherries on a cherry tree." The water in the area was only 55 feet deep. Though the seafloor was covered with debris from old and modern shipwrecks, no vessel could be seen in the general vicinity of the find. Miscovich and Elchlepp immediately began recovering the emeralds. The total haul amounted to 154 pounds of emeralds, a find that was potentially worth millions of dollars.

Miscovich immediately began to look for a way to market the emeralds. He reached out to his younger brother Scott, who in turn contacted several friends of his that worked in finance. With help, Miscovich paid a retainer to set up a company - Emerald Reef, LLC - with which to fund the recovery of the emeralds. One of the company's first major purchases was to acquire a 115-foot dinner-cruise boat for $700,000; this ship was then outfitted to act as a proper salvage ship. Miscovich claimed that the ship could bring in between 10 and 20 million dollars' worth of emeralds per trip. The first emeralds that Miscovich recovered were shown to a gemologist from the Smithsonian Institution and an appraiser from Christie's Auctions; both concluded that the gems were not suitable for jewelry, but that they were from the Muzo region of Colombia — a locale renowned for its emeralds.

Due to the contentious topic of marine salvage law, Miscovich did not publicly announce the find immediately. The recovery operation was conducted with complete secrecy; Miscovich refused to tell anyone not directly involved in the recovery effort about the location or size of the hoard. Miscovich tracked down Cunningham and paid him $50,000 to forego any legal claim on the wreck, and hired a notary to watch the transaction. A New York investment group, Azalp, LLC, agreed to finance the salvage operation in return for equity in the emeralds. Miscovich's original company - Emerald Reef - was also folded into a new company, JTR Enterprises. The find was announced in January 2011, months after Miscovich claimed to have begun recovering emeralds from the wreck.

Miscovich wanted to prove the authenticity of the find and appraise the emeralds on their worth. The Gemological Appraisal Laboratory ran spectroscopic tests on the emeralds and determined that the stones were from Colombia. Sotheby's of New York estimated some of the larger emeralds were worth $45,000 apiece, while others were appraised at $25,000 to $80,000. Almost all of the experts agreed that the stones would be worth more if it could be proven that they were from a famous shipwreck. As word of the treasure spread, it attracted much attention in the media and the marine salvage industry. Members of the Key West salvage industry voiced doubts about the find, claiming that it was unlikely to find uncovered emeralds on the seabed. In April 2012 the television program 60 Minutes produced a story about Miscovich titled The Trouble with Treasure, further increasing the notoriety of the wreck.

=== Ownership disputes ===
As there was no definitive wreck or diving site in the vicinity of the emeralds' location, disputes immediately arose as to who was the owner of the site. Miscovich claimed the site was the property of his company and hired the Delaware law firm Young Conaway Stargatt & Taylor to defend his claim, and retained Bruce Silverstein (a partner at Young Conaway) as his legal counsel. Many different claimants would eventually become involved in the legal dispute. JTR had to contend with the Spanish Government, which could claim a certain percentage of the salvage profits if the emeralds were from a Spanish ship. There was also speculation that the emeralds were from the missing sterncastle of the Nuestra Señora de Atocha, and as such Motivation, Inc. (who owned the Atocha wreck) filed suit against JTR, trying to claim a portion of the treasure. Under U.S. federal law, discoverers of treasure were not able to claim their finds until ownership of the site was established, and as such Miscovich and JTR Enterprises were unable to sell the emeralds they recovered on the open market. After several months, Miscovich and JTR were running out of funds. To raise more money, Miscovich sought out more investors and began covering his expenses by offering percentages of the emerald haul. Several of Miscovich's friends, his landlord, and his legal counsel all agreed to be partially paid with percentages of expected profits from the emeralds.

As his legal and financial troubles mounted, Miscovich's behavior grew increasingly suspicious. In August 2011 Miscovich and a friend approached David Horan, JTR's admiralty lawyer, with a collection of English, Danish, and French coins, asking if these could be used to disqualify the Spanish from a claim to the wreck. Horan confronted Miscovich, with the diver admitting that the coins had not in fact come from his wreck. During this same time, Miscovich also sent a member of JTR's advisory board to negotiate with the Colombian government. Miscovich proposed that, if his company were to be tied down in litigation for too long, he would allow the Colombian government to claim control of the wreck. In exchange, he proposed that he and his investors be named as salvors and granted a share of the recovered treasure. In late 2011, a dispute broke out among the investors in JTR after Miscovich demanded greater personal control over the emeralds, which were supposed to be stored in a New York bank. He was accused of stashing emeralds on the side in his Pennsylvania home. The ongoing legal battle between JTR Enterprises and Motivation, Inc. in Delaware also resulted in Miscovich's money supply being frozen.

In early 2012 Miscovich's story suffered a major blow when two European gemology labs tested the emeralds and found that they had been coated in epoxy, a polymer not invented until the early 20th century. JTR countered that multiple American gemology labs had also tested the gems and found no epoxy. However, in court an expert from Motivation, Inc. determined that, epoxy or not, the condition of the emeralds was not consistent with those from other 17th-century shipwrecks, so they were worth far less than was originally proposed. These significant developments, coupled with the strong opinions of expert wreck hunters from Key West, resulted in many investors pulling out of JTR Enterprises.

Doubts about the authenticity of the shipwreck grew, and Miscovich fell further into debt. Miscovich committed suicide by shotgun in October 2013.

=== Revelation as a hoax ===
In January 2014 American tests found that the Miscovich Emeralds were coated with epoxy, thus corroborating the European claim. Soon after, the owner of a gem store in Jupiter, Florida admitted that he had sold Miscovich $80,000 worth of uncut emeralds in 2010. Following these revelations, Motivation, Inc. and Azalp, LLC filed suit against JTR Enterprises and Young Conaway, claiming that both entities had committed fraud against investors by withholding information that would have revealed the emeralds to be fake. Particular focus was put on Young Conaway attorney Bruce Silverstein, who had reportedly paid some of Miscovich's personal expenses and was entitled to 1.5% of the emerald's equity. Furthermore, Motivation requested that Young Conaway be sanctioned for bad faith litigation. These sanctions were later dropped.

== Bibliography ==
- Baird, Robert P. 2016. "Emerald Sea - the making and un-making of a half-billion-dollar treasure hunt". Harper's Magazine, April 2016 issue.
