= Conspiracy 58 =

2002 Swedish television film

- Also known as: Konspiration 58
- Genre: mockumentary
- Country of origin: Sweden
- Original language: Swedish
- No. of episodes: 1

Original release
- Network: SVT
- Release: 29 May 2002

Conspiracy 58 (Swedish: Konspiration 58 or KSP58) is a Swedish mockumentary from 2002, produced by Sveriges Television, the Swedish public broadcaster. The film examines the fictional KSP58 movement, that claims that the 1958 FIFA World Cup in Sweden did not really take place, but was faked and exists only as forged television and radio coverage in a conspiracy between American and Swedish television, the CIA and FIFA as part of the Cold War. In the film, it is said that Sweden did not have the economic or technical resources to actually host such a large event. In the plot, the American motive for doing this was to test the effectiveness of televised propaganda. When the film originally aired, the audience was not told in advance that it was a mockumentary, giving the impression that Conspiracy 58 was a regular documentary film.

== Plot ==
A large amount of "evidence" is presented. For example, there is analysis of television recordings of the matches, where houses can be seen in the background that never actually stood there. The film also analyzes how the shadows of the players in the field were falling, and were angled in a way that is not possible in Sweden given the position of the sun at the time. The Chairman of KSP58, Bror Jacques de Wærn, who was employed by the Swedish National Agency for more than twenty years, states that he has looked for evidence that the tournament really took place, but didn't find anything. At the end of the film, it is revealed to be a mockumentary from the credits, which state "dokumentär fiktion" (which means "Fiction Documentary").

The aim of the film, according to the director Johan Löfstedt, was to illustrate how historical revisionism (in particular Holocaust denial) works and to highlight the importance of source criticism when getting information from, for example, the media.

The majority of the characters in the film are real celebrities who were playing themselves.

== Cast ==
Name	Cast
Bror Jacques de Wærn	Author, historian, professor, Chairman of KSP58
Olof Arnell	Director of KSP58
Ingrid Lorentzen	Treasurer of the KSP58 Foundation
Thomas Böhm	Psychologist
Caj Ernelli	Bookseller
Bengt Grive	Sports-writer in the 1950s
Ulf Drakenberg	Sports-journalist in the 1950s
Bengt Ågren	Secretary of the FIFA Organization Committee 1958
Per Carlsson	Chairman of the Vindicate the 1958 Movement
Lennart Johansson	UEFA president 1990–2007
Agne Simonsson	Player in Sweden men's national football team 1958
Kurt Hamrin	Player in Sweden men's national football team 1958
Sigvard Parling	Player in Sweden men's national football team 1958
