= Chen Jing (engineer) =

Chinese engineer (1935–2024)

- 陈景
- Born: 9 March 1935; Dali County, Yunnan, China
- Died: 1 June 2024 (aged 89); Kunming, Yunnan, China
- Education: Yunnan University
- Scientific career
- Fields: Precious metal metallurgy
- Workplaces: Kunming Institute of Precious Metals

Chinese name
- Simplified Chinese: 陈景
- Traditional Chinese: 陳景
Transcriptions
Standard Mandarin
- Hanyu Pinyin: Chén Jǐng

Chen Jing (Chinese: 陈景; 9 March 1935 – 1 June 2024) was a Chinese specialist in precious metal metallurgy, and an academician of the Chinese Academy of Engineering.

== Biography ==
Chen was born into a highly educated family, in Dali County (now Dali), Yunnan, on 9 March 1935. He attended Yunnan Provincial Dali Middle School (now Yunnan Provincial Dali No. 1 High School). In 1954, he entered Yunnan University, where he majored in chemistry.

After university in September 1958, Chen was assigned to work at the Kunming Workstation (now Kunming Precious Metals Research Institute) under the Shanghai Institute of Metallurgical Ceramics, Chinese Academy of Sciences, where he successively served as an assistant researcher, deputy director of the Metallurgical Research Office, deputy researcher, and researcher. He joined the Chinese Communist Party (CCP) in May 1960. He joined the faculty of the School of Chemical Science and Engineering, Yunnan University, in 2005.

On 1 June 2024, Chen died in Kunming, Yunnan, at the age of 89.

== Honors and awards ==
- 1985 State Science and Technology Progress Award (First Class)
- 1997 Member of the Chinese Academy of Engineering (CAE)
