= Gorgeous Guy =

2001 Internet hoax

The Gorgeous Guy was the name given to a man whose photo appeared on an internet message board, with various posts describing his life. The photo was of Dan Baca, and it was later revealed to be an elaborate hoax, set up by Baca himself.

In May 2001, Dan Baca, a 29-year-old computer network engineer began to notice people were staring at him as he waited for his bus. Some people would start conversations with him, and then some people started taking photos of him. They appeared to be familiar with his routine, what clothes he wore, and what color his bag was. He was eventually told that his photo had been posted to an internet message board, Craigslist, on May 11, and there were numerous comments written about him. The thread, entitled "Gorgeous Guy @ 4th and Market at the MUNI/Amtrak Bus Stop (Mon-Fri)" became the most popular in the "missed connections" section. The picture's caption read "Gorgeous Guy", and the anonymous poster wanted to know who he was, and if they could meet up with him. Various posts that followed discussed various aspects of Baca's personal life, such as his facial features, his marital status, and his sexuality. They also discussed his schedule and who was going to date him. Baca eventually posted a message, asking people to stop talking to him and about him, but doing so caused more problems, and Baca had to resort to other forms of transport to get to work.

== Media attention ==
The story came to the media's attention when freelance journalist David Cassel was tipped off about the story by Mat Honan, a freelance writer from San Francisco. Cassel published an article in the San Francisco Bay Guardian on May 30, keeping Baca's name confidential. Following this, CNN and USA Today both published articles, including his real name. Various other news outlets also contacted him. Despite Baca's original plea for privacy, he intended to take the chance to make the most of his fame; he expressed interest in becoming a model, actor, or becoming involved in charity work.

== Hoax ==
On July 11, 2001, Baca revealed that the whole thing was a hoax. He was said to have made over 50 posts using various email addresses on Craigslist, pretending to be other people. He also explained that he made up most of the stories about people recognizing him in the street. Baca apparently had no motive for the hoax, claiming he was just "playing around".
