= Maggie Murphy hoax =

1895 hoax in the United States

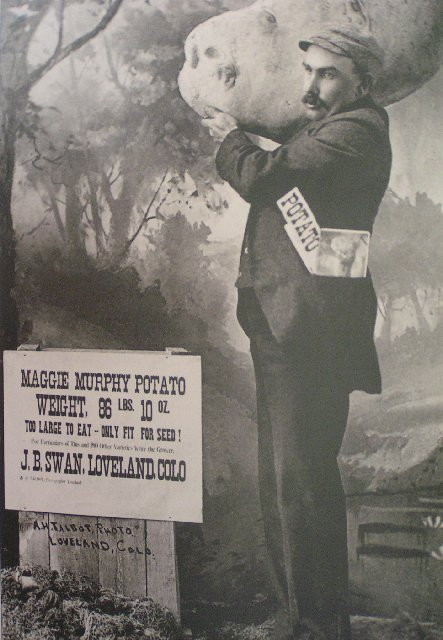
The widely circulated image of Joseph B. Swan holding the supposed potato

The Maggie Murphy hoax was a hoax perpetrated in 1895 by newspaper editor-in-chief W. L. Thorndyke. He created an image that depicted farmer Joseph B. Swan holding what appeared to be a giant potato. The photo rapidly spread around the United States, and appeared in a panel of Ripley's Believe It or Not!.

== Background ==
The hoax began in Loveland, Colorado. W. L. Thorndyke, editor-in-chief for a local newspaper, had wanted to promote an upcoming street fair. Thorndyke turned to farmer Joseph B. Swan, and wanted to help bring customers to him. Swan had been known for growing more than 70 different types of potatoes and had previously been featured in several news reports for his success with his crop.

With the help of local photographer Adam Talbot, they produced a photograph which appeared in an 1895 issue of the Loveland Reporter. It was implied the potato weighed 86 pounds 10 ounces, and measured 2 feet 5 inches. Swan swore that he grew it himself. The image quickly spread around the United States. Over one thousand citizens sent letters to Thorndyke, requesting pieces of Maggie Murphy so they could grow their own oversized potato. Requests for seeds were also common. Thorndyke, realizing that the photograph was beginning to get out of control, admitted that it was a hoax. He wrote that he had asked Swan to carve a fake potato out of wood.

== Cultural impact ==
The photograph appeared in numerous publications, including Scientific American and Ripley's Believe It or Not!. It has been reprinted in the book The World of Ripley's Believe It Or Not!, however, no mention is made of the photograph being a hoax. When Ripley's Believe It or Not! was adapted into a television series, the photograph was used in the opening segment. In 2012, Colorado playwright Rick Padden adapted the tale of the hoax into a two-act play, entitled The Great Loveland Potato Hoax.

== See also ==
- Cottingley Fairies
