= Stardrive 2000 =

1986 advertising hoax in Oregon, United States

Stardrive 2000 was a radio advertising hoax in the Portland, Oregon, area in early 1986. It advertised an automobile which purportedly needed no gasoline, and no service for up to 200,000 miles, but could accelerate from zero to 50 mph in 5.2 seconds selling for just $8,000.

Ironically, the hoax was a stunt perpetrated by the Portland Area Radio Council to increase the perceived effectiveness of radio advertising.

The Oregon Attorney General threatened a $25,000 fine to radio stations which continued carrying the advertisement.
