= Joseph R. Biden Jr. Presidential Library =

Presidential library

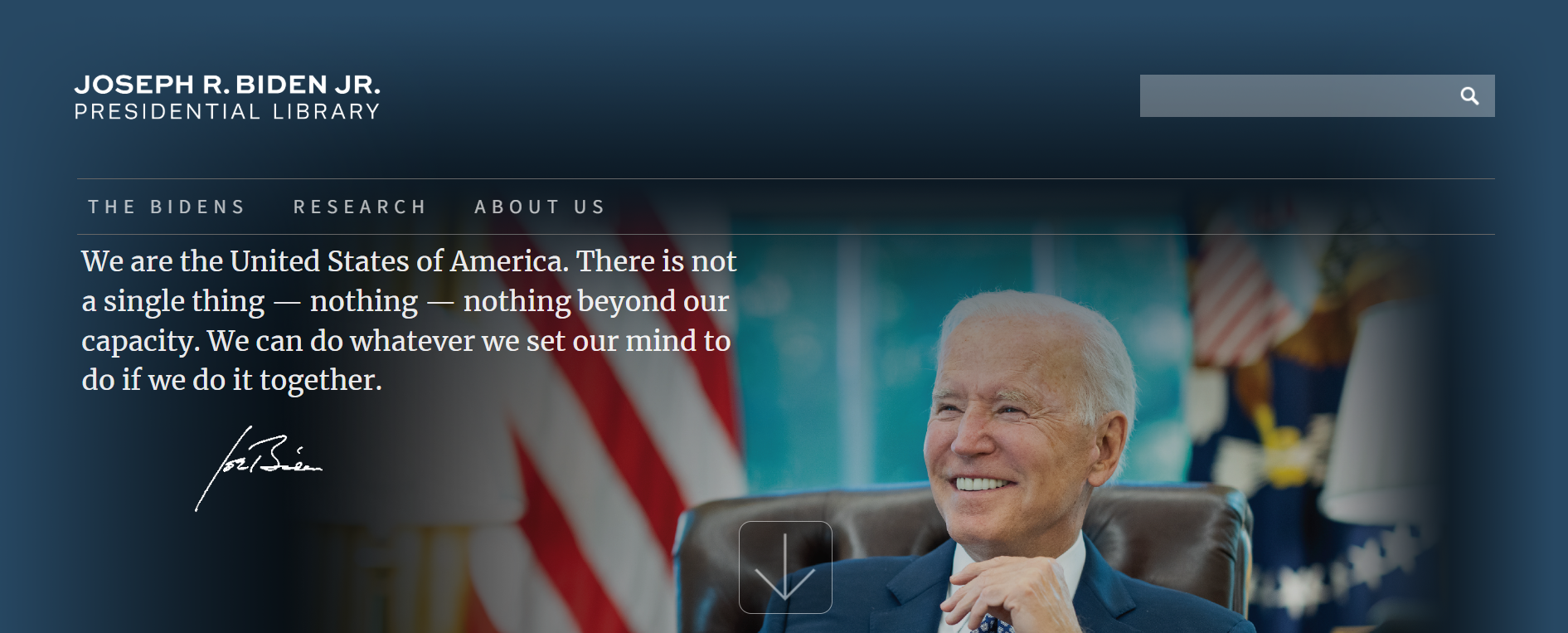
- Available in: English
- Headquarters: TBD
- Country of origin: United States
- Owner: National Archives and Records Administration
- Creator: Archival Operations Division – Biden Presidential Library
- Key people: Joe Biden
- Website: bidenlibrary.gov
- Commercial: No
- Launched: January 20, 2025; 20 months ago
- Content license: Public domain

The Joseph R. Biden Jr. Presidential Library is an archive of the National Archives and Records Administration (NARA) in which state papers related to the presidency of Joe Biden have been deposited following his term as President of the United States, as well as a proposed presidential center dedicated to the presidency of Joe Biden.

== Background ==
Presidential libraries are archives and museums, bringing together the documents and artifacts of a U.S. president and his administration. While libraries and their contents are maintained by NARA, other costs have traditionally been borne by private donors. According to NARA, each former president selects the architect for the library and is "solely responsible for choice of the final location for the Library building and for the construction costs".

== Location ==
The library's contact location is Room 1510 of 8601 Adelphi Road, College Park, Maryland, a U.S. government office building in the suburbs of Washington, D.C.

Following the second inauguration of Donald Trump, on January 20, 2025, NARA announced it had "assumed custody of the records and artifacts of the Biden administration". According to NARA, Biden had not, as of that date, formally "indicated his intentions with regard to a Presidential Library".

== History ==
According to Joe Biden, in a story related by him to Robert Hur during Hur's investigation of the Joe Biden classified documents incident, the topic of his presidential library was first broached by Jill Biden in July 2023 following remarks he gave at the Harry Truman Presidential Library, after which he began thinking about it more closely. Annie Tomasini and Anthony Bernal were subsequently designated by Biden to organize fundraising for the library's construction.

The University of Delaware in Newark, Delaware, and Syracuse University in Syracuse, New York, were both initially cited by Biden as possible locations for the library facility. As of July 2024, however, the University of Delaware reported it was "unaware of any conversations on this topic" while a spokesperson for Syracuse said at the same time that "there have been no conversations to date on this". At the 2024 Millsummit leadership conference, civic leaders in Wilmington discussed the possibility of repurposing the Daniel L. Herrmann Courthouse to serve as site of the Biden library.

In November 2024, The Wall Street Journal reported that some donors were putting up "resistance" to giving funds for the library. The next month, following Biden's pardon of Hunter Biden, several major Democratic Party donors reportedly signaled their intent to withhold donations for the proposed library facility altogether. Some donors were reportedly still upset "over his decision to seek a second term despite health issues".

As of December 2024, NARA was recruiting staff to prepare the Biden library document collections. In January 2025, Philadelphia mayor Cherelle Parker expressed interest in lobbying for the library to be built in her city. In March 2025, Wilmington, Delaware lobbied for the library to be built in its city. In September 2025, Biden selected his own state of Delaware as the location for his library entity as presidential center and approved a 13-person governance board that is charged with steering the project.
