= Rejecting Jane =

2007 article by David Lassman

The 'Rejecting Jane' cover of Issue No. 28 of Jane Austen's Regency World Magazine

"Rejecting Jane" is the title of a 2007 article by British author David Lassman. The article, which was published in Issue 28 of Jane Austen's Regency World magazine, is a critique of the publishing industry through their inadvertent rejection of Jane Austen.

== The idea ==
Using the pseudonym 'Alison Laydee' – a play on Austen's original pen name "A Lady" – Lassman sent out the opening chapters of Pride and Prejudice, Northanger Abbey and Persuasion to several major publishers and literary agents, with different titles but only minor changes to the text, such as character names and locations. The resultant article discussed how all but one of the publishers and agents failed to recognise her works, including Penguin Books and Bloomsbury, with the vast majority rejecting the attempt to gain a publishing deal. This was also despite Pride and Prejudice's opening line, "It is a truth universally acknowledged, that a single man in possession of a good fortune, must be in want of a wife," being left intact.

== Reaction ==
On its publication the article created worldwide media coverage, which saw its author appear on radio and television programmes across the globe, including American news programmes and TV talk shows such as Good Morning America.
