= Hanxin =

Chinese academic fraudulence case

Hanxin (simplified Chinese: 汉芯; traditional Chinese: 漢芯; pinyin: Hànxīn) was a notorious scandal of academic fraudulence in China. Chen Jin, a professor at Shanghai Jiao Tong University, claimed in 2003 to have developed a new digital signal processing (DSP) microchip called the "Hanxin 1", which would have been the first DSP chip to have been wholly developed in China. However, Chen Jin's invention was later exposed as a Motorola chip with the original identifications sandpapered away.

According to analysts, the case underscores the pressure on Chinese researchers to develop technological innovations which would enable China to bridge the gap with the West. The Hanxin scandal was viewed as a major setback to China's ambition in terms of losses of substantial public funds and time in a race that China had already been losing.

== Exposure ==
At the beginning of 2006, an anonymous user posted an article on the Chinese internet forum Tianya Club about the forgery of this DSP chip with very detailed references. Later, various Chinese media, including Ming Pao, a Hong Kong newspaper, claims that various ministries of the Chinese government have been investigating the Hanxin, and Chen may have duplicated a Freescale DSP from the West.

On May 12, 2006, the China News Service reported that Chen's research was faked and the Hanxin project had been cancelled.

The government decided to rescind all funds allocated to the Hanxin research, permanently banned Chen from doing any government-funded research, and ordered him to return investment money. He could also face a criminal investigation.
