= Chen Jin (computer scientist) =

Chinese computer scientist

- Born: 1968 (age 57–58); Putian, Fujian
- Citizenship: China
- Education: Tongji University (BSc); University of Texas at Austin (MSc, PhD)
- Occupation: Computer scientist

Chen Jin (Chinese: 陈进; pinyin: Chén Jìn; born in 1968) is a Chinese computer scientist.

Chen was born in Putian, Fujian, in 1968, along with a twin brother. He earned a bachelor's degree from Tongji University in Shanghai and in 1991, moved to the United States to study computer engineering at the University of Texas at Austin. In 1998, he earned a Ph.D. there while working at Motorola's Austin research center. Chen moved back to China in 2000 and worked at Shanghai Jiao Tong University.

In 2003, Chen announced a breakthrough in microchip design. The Chinese government, eager to develop an indigenous hi-tech industry, greeted the news with great delight. He was appointed Dean of Microelectronics at Shanghai Jiao Tong University and promised to deliver newer chips Hanxin II and III in 2004. However, it was proven to be fraudulent as a whistleblower revealed that the Hanxin chip was not his creation. This resulted in his expulsion and possible criminal investigation by authorities.
