= Kill switch (disambiguation) =

A kill switch is a security measure used to shut off or render a device inoperable in an emergency.

Kill Switch or Killswitch may also refer to:

== Film and television ==
- Kill Switch (2008 film), a film starring Steven Seagal
- Kill Switch (2017 film), an American-Dutch film directed by Tim Smit
- Killswitch (film), a 2014 documentary about the battle for control of the Internet
- "Kill Switch" (CSI: Miami), a television episode
- "Kill Switch" (The X-Files), a television episode

== Literature ==
- Kill Switch, a 2016 Joe Ledger Series novel by Jonathan Maberry
- The Kill Switch, a 2014 Tucker Wayne novel by James Rollins and Grant Blackwood

== Music ==
- Kill Switch...Klick or Kill Switch, an American industrial rock band
- "Kill Switch", a song by Chet Faker from Built on Glass

== Other uses ==
- Kill Switch (video game), a 2003 third-person shooter
- Killswitch (video game), an urban legend about a video game that deletes itself, originating from a short story by Catherynne M. Valente
- Killswitch (professional wrestling) or inverted double underhook facebuster, a finishing move used by the professional wrestler Christian
- Killswitch (professional wrestler), wrestler previously known as Luchasaurus
- Internet kill switch, a shut-off mechanism for all Internet traffic
