= List of fictional games =

Index of imaginary games created in fictional works

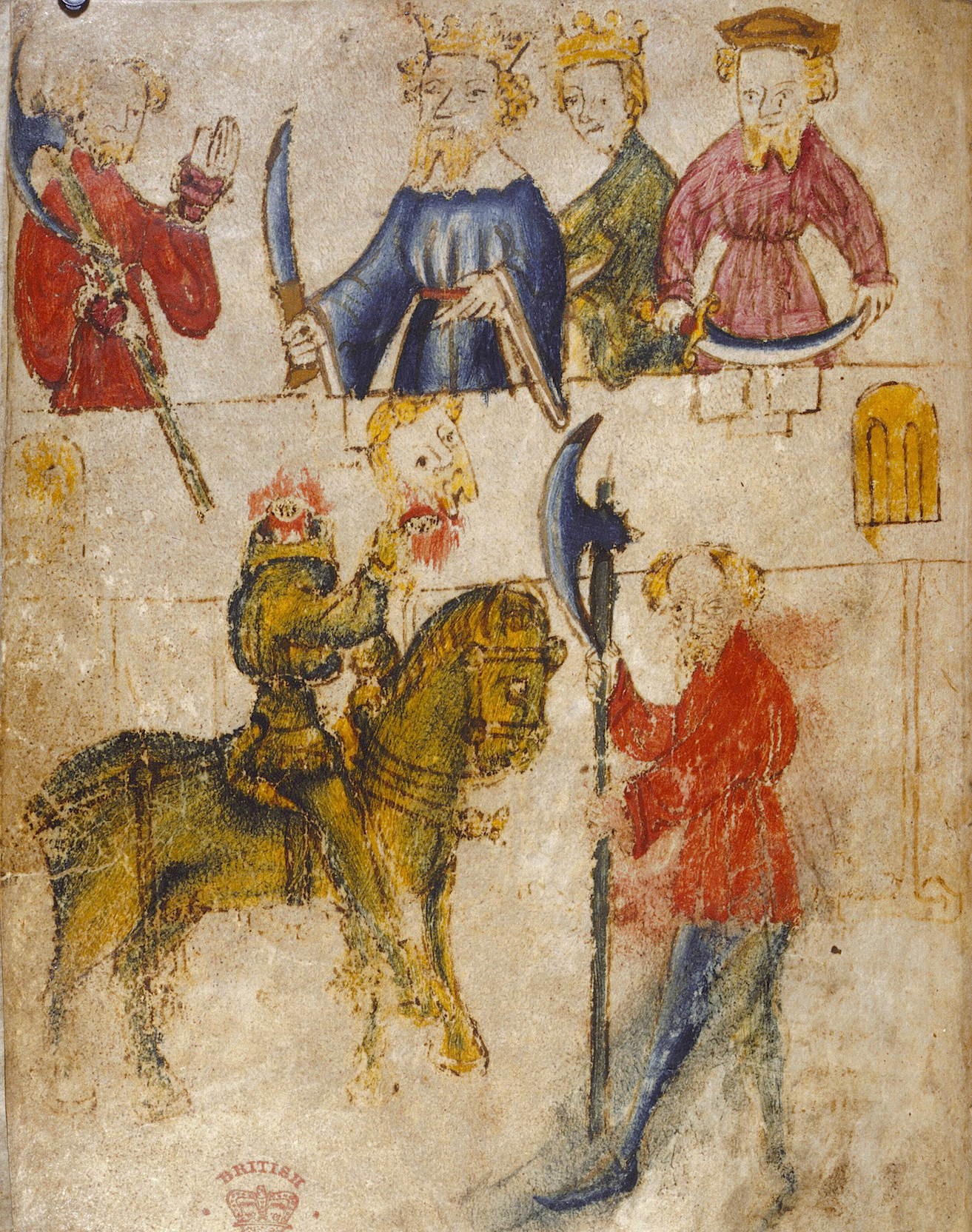
A 14th-century illustration of Sir Gawain playing the first round of the beheading game with the Green Knight

Fictional games are games which were specifically created for works of fiction, or which otherwise originated in fiction.

In his foundational academic work on this topic, Stefano Gualeni defines fictional games as "playful activities and ludic artefacts conceptualized as part of fictional worlds", and emphasizes that - as elements of a work of fiction - their purpose is to trigger the imagination of the audience and cannot actually be (or at least were not originally meant to be) played.

Many fictional games have, however, been adapted into real games by fans or ludophiles by creating pieces and rules to fit the descriptions given in the source work. For example, unofficial versions of Fizzbin can be found in reality, and Mornington Crescent is widely played in online forums.

Fictional games tend not to be presented in a detailed and formally complete manner by their authors. Within the respective works of fiction, they are typically defined just clearly enough to achieve their intended narrative functions.

== Billiards games ==
- Dom-Jot – Star Trek: The Next Generation, a game similar to bumper pool played on an irregularly shaped table.

== Board games ==
- Azad – A tactical game featured in the novel The Player of Games by Iain M. Banks.
- The Blackening – A trivia game based on African-American history and culture, featured in the film of the same name.
- Cones of Dunshire – A strategy game invented by Ben Wyatt in Parks and Recreation.
- Cyvasse – A strategy game in George R.R. Martin's A Song of Ice and Fire series, which appears to be a combination of Chess and Battleship.
- Dejarik or Holochess – A variant of chess played in the Star Wars setting.
- Dragonchess - A three-dimensional chess variant created by Gary Gygax for Dungeons & Dragons.
- Eels and Escalators - A parody of snakes and ladders from SpongeBob SquarePants.
- Gatlopp – A drinking game from the film Gatlopp: Hell of a Game.
- Gungi – A strategy game in the Hunter × Hunter manga and anime. It is played on a non-checkered gameboard with 81 squares arranged in a 9×9 grid, and has 13 different types of pieces and several stacked constructs.
- Icehouse – The Empty City by Andrew Looney; an example of a fictional game that now exists as a real-world one.
- Jetan – A chess-like strategy game from the Edgar Rice Burroughs novel The Chessmen of Mars.
- Jumanji – A magical board game from the book and movie of the same name, later released in a variant as a real game.
- Kadis-kot – A board game first seen in the Star Trek: Voyager episode "Infinite Regress".
- Liar's Lament – A board game first seen in the Pretty Little Liars episode "Playtime".
- Pai Sho – A strategy game first seen in the Avatar: The Last Airbender episode "The Waterbending Scroll". The game was recreated in real life, first by fans and then by Nickelodeon.
- Remnant: The Game – A board game in RWBY with the objective of conquering the world.
- Sazou – A game similar to Chess played on Draconia and Gallifrey in Doctor Who.
- Stars and Comets – in Andre Norton novels.
- Stealth chess – A chess variant played in the Ankh-Morpork Assassins' Guild, in which pieces move invisibly; Discworld.
- Survivor – A two-player game in Return to Zork. The game is asymmetric, and the Zork player character must ultimately win two games, one as each of the Survivor players, to complete Return to Zork.
- Tadek – A strategy game in the Farscape episode "The Flax" that involves building holographic columns while pushing game pieces around a board; the game can be used for gambling.
- Tak – A strategy game in The Name of the Wind by Patrick Rothfuss, later developed into a real game.
- Three-Cornered Pitney – An unplayable board game invented by Mad Magazine.
- Three-Dimensional Chess – A strategy game first seen in the Star Trek episode "Where No Man Has Gone Before", later developed into a real game.
- Thud – A chess-like game of Trolls and Dwarves appearing in Terry Pratchett's novel of the same name.
- Wizard's chess – A variant of chess in the Harry Potter universe, featuring magically animated, intelligent pieces.
- Zathura – A Jumanji-like game from the book of the same name and the film Zathura: A Space Adventure.

== Card games ==
- Caravan – A two player card game used for both gambling and passing time in Fallout: New Vegas.
- Card Wars - In Adventure Time, this is a two-player, head-to-head card game involving building landscapes, casting spells, and using creatures to defeat an opponent.
- Cripple Mr. Onion – Discworld; Fan rules have been created, but are not official, and use ordinary playing cards rather than a Discworld "Caroc" deck.
- Damage – A poker-like card game from Iain M. Banks's Culture novels, wherein players and audience members are subjected to telepathic emotional assaults based on cards played and losses result in the execution of bystanders affiliated with each player.
- Double Fanucci – A fictional card game mentioned throughout the Zork series of computer adventure games.
- Dragon Poker – The MythAdventures books by Robert Asprin.
- Fizzbin – A card game in Star Trek. It was spontaneously created by James T. Kirk as a distraction to escape capture on Sigma Iota II.
- Go Johnny Go Go Go Go – A card game from the television series, The League of Gentlemen from the Series 2 episode, "A Plague on Royston Vasey".
- Gwent – A card game in the novel series The Witcher. Later available as a video game.
- Joustus - A card game in Shovel Knight: King of Cards. It makes up half of the DLC's gameplay, and is used as the impetus for its plot.
- Lucky Horseshoes – A variant of Blackjack found in Fallout: New Vegas, played with an animatronic cowboy in exchange for in-game rewards.
- Pazaak – A two player card game in a 2003 Star Wars game, similar to Blackjack, where players have to be the closest to 20 without going over, in a best of three rounds competition. Players have their own assembled side deck of 10 cards, with both positive and negative values present, from which they pull four random cards at the start of a round. The main table deck has cards with values from 1–10, of which one card gets drawn for each player each turn.
- Queen's Blood – A minigame in Final Fantasy VII Rebirth.
- Sabacc – A card game used for gambling in Star Wars, and the game in which Han Solo won the Millennium Falcon from Lando Calrissian. Real versions of the game have been produced and can be bought at Disneyland.
- Tall Card – A draw poker-like game seen in Firefly, where trump cards are "tall" and suits such as plums replace traditional card iconography.
- Three-Dragon Ante – A card game used primarily for gambling in Dungeons & Dragons, played with a deck of 70 cards divided between 63 dragon cards, and 7 mortal cards. Dragon cards have a color, and a power, similar to suit and rank in a traditional deck of 52 cards.
- Tongo – Star Trek: Deep Space Nine TV series.
- Towers – A card game used to teach war strategy to generals in the Stormlight Archive series series by Brandon Sanderson.
- Triad – Battlestar Galactica (2004 series)(In the 1978 series and Galactica 1980, a similar game was called Pyramid.).
- Triple Triad – First appearing in the video game Final Fantasy VIII, it can also be played as a minigame in Final Fantasy XIV: A Realm Reborn and Final Fantasy Portal App. In 1999, after the release of Final Fantasy VIII, toy company, Bandai, produced a real Triple Triad card deck. Since the game was only produced in Japan and not readily available in America and Europe, the cards have become rare collector's items.

== MMORPGS/Role-playing games ==
- Bat'leths & BiHnuchs – A Dungeons & Dragons-pastiche tabletop roleplaying game within the Star Trek universe, first appearing in the Lower Decks episode "The Least Dangerous Game". Game players assume the roles of legendary Klingon warriors and complete glorious adventures. The title roughly translates as "swords and cowards".
- Bunkers & Badasses – A parody of Dungeons & Dragons, the central game played in Tiny Tina's Assault on Dragon Keep, (a DLC for the video game Borderlands 2 ) and in Tiny Tina's Wonderlands.
- The Game – A parody of World of Warcraft, the unnamed MMORPG is played by the central characters of The Guild web series.
- HackMaster, which later became a real tabletop game, and its many spinoffs – Knights of the Dinner Table.
- Kingdom Scrolls – From the British television series Dead Pixels.
- OASIS – A virtual world and MMORPG featured in Ready Player One by Ernest Cline.
- Ogres & Oubliettes – A tabletop role-playing game in the My Little Pony: Friendship Is Magic animated series.
- Raven's Banquet – An expansion pack featured in the first season of Mythic Quest, designed for the MMORPG of the same name.
- T'Rain – A World of Warcraft like MMORPG featured in Reamde by Neal Stephenson.

== Sports ==
=== Athletic sports ===
- Assassin's Guild Wall Game – "A cross between squash, urban rock climbing and actual bodily harm", Discworld (named after the Eton Wall Game).
- Calica - A hybrid of laser tag, dodgeball, and capture the flag from the Star Trek universe, wherein players wield simulated firearms that can teleport opponents to a penalty box, and the objective is to blast a goal guarded by the opposing team's mascot. (First appeared in the Starfleet Academy episode "Vitus Reflux".)
- Lifting – A popular extreme sport, similar to surfing, but in the air; practitioners ride "reflection boards" on waves of "Transparence Light Particles"; from anime/manga series Eureka Seven.
- Taking the Stone – In Farscape, a game played by the youth of an unnamed royal cemetery planet. The game consists of jumping into a deep well, and chanting while falling. To protect a participant from smashing into the bottom of the well and dying, there is a sonic net which is sustained by the participants' voices, and is intended to provide a soft landing.

=== Combat sports ===
- Anbo-Jitsu – Star Trek: The Next Generation, a one-on-one martial arts combat sport wherein the players are blindfolded and use proximity-detector staves to locate the opponent.
- Ape Fighting – From Futurama, a fighting sport involving two apes (typically gorillas) engaging in pugilistic combat while adorned with comically-undersized costumes and props.
- The Hunger Games – From the franchise of the same name. Each year, adolescents from oppressed districts are forced to fight to the last survivor in an elaborate outdoor arena, itself designed to pose many threats to tributes' lives, for the entertainment of citizens in the wealthy Capitol district.
- Kosho – From The Prisoner, Kosho appeared prominently in the episode "It's Your Funeral". According to Kosho rules, one opponent must knock the other into a four-by-eight foot tank of water. Trampolines are placed on two sides of the pool and ledges above on three. Upon any successful dunking, the Kosho match is over.
- Pro-Bending – From The Legend of Korra, involves two teams of three benders, one from each of the main bending arts besides airbending. The objective of the sport is to gain as much territory within the ring as possible within three minutes, or, alternatively, to drive the members of the opposing team over the edge of the ring.
- The Running Man – From The Running Man, the titular television show features convicted criminals fighting for their lives (and pardons) in an arena while being hunted down by professional celebrity mercenaries called "stalkers", presented in the same vein as theme-based pro-wrestlers.

=== Team ball sports ===
- 43-Man Squamish – A college sport from Mad Magazine.
- Arena Stickball – A sport from Alternia, in both Homestuck and Hiveswap wherein two teams of 5 players compete to score points using 16 different balls. The game is played over two 11-hour halves.
- BASEketball – From the film of the same name.
- Blaseball – From the browser game of the same name.
- Blernsball – The 30th-century version of baseball from Futurama, wherein it is called the "Earthican Pastime."
- Blitzball – Final Fantasy X, a soccer-like game played in a massive sphere of water.
- Calvinball – A game where there are only two rules: players must wear masks, and one can never play the same way twice; Calvin and Hobbes by Bill Watterson.
- Exy - From the book series All For The Game it is summed up as Lacrosse with the violence of Ice Hockey. Two teams of six attempt to throw the ball into their respective goal with Exy racquets.
- Grav-Ball – A future sport played in a zero-G court by two six-man teams, who try to score goals with a five-kilogram steel ball, as depicted in the board game by FASA.
- Grifball – A violent rugby-style game where two teams try to bring bombs to their own goal, as seen in Halo 3 (2007).
- HyperBlade – A violent variant of ice hockey played on an ellipsoidal rink with either a puck or a severed head, from the PC game of the same name.
- Mittens – A game played in Foon featuring nonsensical rules from the improvisational comedy podcast Hello From the Magic Tavern.
- Moopsball – A team sport created by Gary Cohn in Rules for Moopsball (1976), referenced in Legion of Superheroes and in Gene Wolfe's There Are Doors.
- P.A.S.S. Time – A game revolving around bringing weaponry on the field, with holding the ball making weapons unusable until passed. Features in Team Fortress 2.
- Pyramid – A basketball-like game featured in Battlestar Galactica
- Quidditch – Harry Potter series by J. K. Rowling, a team sport with four balls and seven players on each team who ride around on broomsticks.
- Speedball – A futuristic and violent mix of handball and hockey featured in the cyberpunk inspired games of the same name.
- Zero-Grav Hyperball – A sport played with rackets and balls played on Gallifrey, as shown in Doctor Who.

=== Non-team ball sports ===
- Gonnis – A combination of golf and tennis featured in the BBC comedy series Look Around You, a parody of science and technology programming.
- Igo Soccer – The participants have to do figures with some pebbles and a ball, sport from the Japanese shõnen Nichijō.

=== Other sports ===
- Apopudobalia – encyclopedia fictitious entry, effectively association football.
- Frolf – From Ribbit King, a version of disc golf.
- Futuresport – From the film ie of the same name, a combination of basketball, baseball and hockey that uses hoverboards and rollerblades.
- The Game – From Piers Anthony's Apprentice Adept series of novels; includes almost all known games and competitions; winners of the yearly Tourney get to become Citizens.
- German batball – From Kurt Vonnegut's novel The Sirens of Titan.
- Guyball – A ball game played by Green Wing's Dr Guy Secretan.
- Hadaul – From Jack Vance's Demon Princes book The Face, a team game involving conspiracies among players, played with double-edged blades almost a foot long.
- Hussade – From Jack Vance's Alastor series, especially prominent in Trullion: Alastor 2262, a team sport played on a gridiron of rungs suspended over a water tank; players body-block members of the opposing team into the tank, while trying to reach the sheirl, a woman standing at her team's home platform.
- Jugger – From the film The Blood of Heroes.
- Light Cycle racing – A race on virtual motorcycles in the Tron franchise.
- The Long Walk – From a Richard Bachman/Stephen King book of the same name
- Motorball – From the Battle Angel Alita manga.
- Parrises Squares – An athletic, full-contact sport in Star Trek.
- Podracing – A violent vehicular racing sport from Star Wars wherein the pilots of "podracers" – massive, twin-engined hover vehicles – participate in a high-tech version of chariot racing.
- Redline – A car elimination race in the film Redline
- Rollerball – From William Harrison's story "Roller Ball Murder", on which the film Rollerball was loosely based.
- Skeet Surfin' – A mixture of surfing and skeet shooting depicted in a musical parody of The Beach Boys in the film Top Secret!.
- Sky-surfing – Appearing in numerous Judge Dredd stories.
- Transcontinental Road Race – Death Race 2000.

== Video games ==
- Alien Child and Perfect Mom – Games from the film Her (2013).
- Bandersnatch, Nohzdyve, and Metl Hedd – Games from Black Mirror: Bandersnatch (2018).
- Battle of Hell and World by Satan – VR games from Taiwanese TV series Q18 Quantum Dice: Allegory of the Quantum (2024).
- Bonestorm and Lee Carvallo's Putting Challenge – Games appearing in the Simpsons episode Marge Be Not Proud.
- Buzz Lightyear: Attack on Zurg – A Super Nintendo game that appears at the beginning of Toy Story 2 (1999).
- Cat Petterz (franchise), Dragon Blazers (series), and Super Smashing Fighters – Games from Deltarune (2018). Cat Petterz is a parody of the Petz series. Dragon Blazers is an RPG loosely based on Lord of the Hammer, a fictitious book series which itself is based on the Prophecy. It is used frequently as an analogy for the world of Deltarune itself. Super Smashing Fighters is a parody of Super Smash Bros..
- Chinpokomon – A parody of the Pokémon franchise that appears in the South Park episode of the same name.
- CURS>R – A text-based adventure game from Choose or Die (2022).
- That Evil Farming Game – An alleged video game involving a farmer killing his wife and hiding her body from police while working on his farm that turned out to be a false memory.
- Fairy Racing – A racing game series from the same title.
- Feathered Serpent – A computer game created by Damian Cray in Alex Rider.
- Fencing, a computer strategy game described in John Brunner's novel Shockwave Rider.
- Fix-It Felix Jr., Sugar Rush, Hero's Duty, and Slaughter Race – Games from Wreck-It Ralph (2012) and its sequel Ralph Breaks the Internet (2018).
- The Game – A head-mounted virtual reality game in the Star Trek: The Next Generation episode "The Game" (S5E06).
- The Game – An unnamed title published by fictional company Game Punch in the TV show I Feel Bad.
- Global Thermonuclear War and Falken's Maze – A military simulation program mistaken for a computer game and a computer game to be played by an artificial intelligence in WarGames (1983).
- Goblin Kart – The rival to Fairy Racing.
- Kebab Fighter – A parody of Street Fighter in The Amazing World of Gumball.
- Killswitch – A fictional video game invented by the writer Catherynne M. Valente that was alleged to be real, and gave rise to an urban legend.
- Leisure Suit Larry 4: The Missing Floppies – The missing fourth installment in the Leisure Suit Larry series. The actual fourth game in the series was called Leisure Suit Larry 5: Passionate Patti Does a Little Undercover Work, and the absence of Leisure Suit Larry 4 inspired speculation and became a prominent in-joke.
- Lucky Wander Boy – fictional Japanese arcade game from the eponymous 2003 novel by D. B. Weiss.
- Maniac Mansion 3: Rise of the Tentacles (also referred to as Rise of the Tentacle) – An alleged sequel to Maniac Mansion and Day of the Tentacle that was to be developed by Pendulo Studios. It was first mentioned in the French gaming magazine Joystick in March 2003, and later confirmed to be an April Fools joke.
- Morio Kart – A parody of Mario Kart from Buddy Daddies.
- Ninja Ninja Revolution – An arcade game appearing in Scott Pilgrim vs. the World (2010).
- Only You Can Save Mankind – A video game appearing in the 1992 Terry Pratchett book of the same name.
- Petscop – A fictional PlayStation video game featured in the horror web series of the same name.
- Polybius – The subject of an urban legend pertaining to an alleged 1981 arcade game. The game has made appearances in various media.
- Roy: A Life Well-Lived – A VR life simulator from the TV series Rick and Morty.
- Sentries of the Last Cosmos – A VR game in the Batman Beyond episode of the same name. The game and creator are portrayed very similarly to Star Wars and George Lucas.
- Space Paranoids – An arcade game created by Kevin Flynn and featured in Tron (1982).
- Spads & Fokkers – A game from the short story "Dogfight", wherein players control holographic World War I-era fighter planes with their thoughts.
- Star Fox Grand Prix – Alleged new title in Nintendo's Star Fox series that turned out to be a hoax.
- Striking Vipers – A VR fighting game from the Black Mirror episode of the same title.
- Super Smasher Sisters, Street Battler versus Kentetsu, and Call of Honor – From Zombie Kid Diaries. Super Smasher Sisters and Street Battler versus Kentetsu are fighting games that parody Super Smash Bros. and Street Fighter X Tekken respectively, and Call of Honor is a shooter series that parodies Call of Duty and Medal of Honor.
- Swamp Bros/Super Smash Swamp Pants Brothers – A parody of Super Smash Bros. from Komi Can't Communicate.
- Total Trash Takedown – A parody of Super Mario Bros. from The Loud House episode "Game Off".
- Valkyrie Wilde: Full Frontal Assault – An alleged Tomb Raider clone featuring a fully nude female main character. It turned out to be an April Fools joke by PlayStation: The Official Magazine.
- Vermis I: Lost Dungeons and Forbidden Woods – A non-existent dark fantasy dungeon crawler video game, the guide for which was created by the pseudonymous artist Plastiboo.
- Wrestle Jam 88 – From the movie The Wrestler (2008).
- Yeah Yeah Beebiss I – An alleged video game whose name appeared in a 1989 ad in the magazine VideoGames & Computer Entertainment.
- Zapazoids – An arcade game from the audio drama series Adventures in Odyssey

== Other games ==
- Chula – In the Star Trek: Deep Space Nine episode "Move Along Home".
- The Glass Bead Game – Hermann Hesse's novel of the same name.
- Mornington Crescent – I'm Sorry I Haven't a Clue radio comedy program.
- Poohsticks – Winnie-the-Pooh.
- Quis – A building game from the Saga of the Skolian Empire novels by Catherine Asaro involving the laying down of geometric solid shapes (dice) in various combinations; rules contain encoded knowledge of one of the former empires in the novel series.
- Sej – A dicing game played in Serpent's Reach.
- True American – In New Girl, a game that is 50% drinking, 50% Candy Land, and also the floor is lava.

== See also ==
- List of games in Star Trek
- List of games with concealed rules
- List of spurious works of fiction
