= Gold Saucer =

Fictional amusement park

- The exterior appearance of the Gold Saucer in Final Fantasy VII.
- First appearance: Final Fantasy VII (1997)
- Last appearance: Final Fantasy VII Rebirth (2024)
- Created by: Square
- Genre: Fantasy

In-universe information
- Type: Amusement park

The Gold Saucer is a fictional amusement park first depicted in the 1997 Square-developed role-playing video game Final Fantasy VII, where it was built as a tourist attraction by the evil corporation Shinra. It returns as the similar Manderville Gold Saucer in the 2013 MMORPG Final Fantasy XIV – where it was founded by Godbert Manderville, father of Hildibrand Manderville – and, finally, in the 2024 Final Fantasy VII Rebirth as a remade version of the original. In all of its incarnations, it serves as a hub for numerous minigames, including chocobo racing, a battle arena, and an arcade. The digital card game Triple Triad was notably added to it in FFXIV, and Queen's Blood to its FFVII Rebirth version. Another feature of the FFVII and FFVII Rebirth Gold Saucer is the ability to date one of the game's party members while riding in a gondola lift. The character Cait Sith, an animatronic toy cat riding a brutish-looking Moogle mascot who is actually a Shinra spy, joins the party while they are inside the park.

The FFVII Gold Saucer was noted by critics for its enjoyable atmosphere, as well as the messaging of wealth disparity and corruption due to its location above the decrepit mining town of Corel. The Gold Saucer and the remotely-operated character of Cait Sith have been described as metaphors for gaming in general and grappling with its environmental harms. While not having the same subtext, FFXIV's Gold Saucer was similarly praised for its minigames.

== Design ==
The Gold Saucer as well as its remade incarnation are located in the middle of the Corel Desert. The only way to reach the park is by tram from the Ropeway Station in North Corel. The Gold Ticket, a lifetime pass, can be purchased for 30,000 Gil, the game's currency, while each admission without the pass costs 3,000 Gil. Areas include Wonder Square, where various arcade minigames are located, Chocobo Square, where chocobo racing takes place, Speed Square, home to a shooting gallery, and Battle Square, a combat simulator.

Manderville Gold Saucer was introduced in patch 2.51 of FFXIV. It includes a new arrangement of the classic Gold Saucer music, chocobo racing, the ability to play Triple Triad, Cactpot - a form of lottery - and various other minigames, as well as "GATE" limited-time public events.

The Gold Saucer was re-imagined in FFVII Rebirth, changing its design to be much larger and moving the locations of some of the minigames. Major locations include Chocobo Square, where chocobo racing tickets are sold, Wonderment Square, which hosts Queen's Blood and the G-Bike and 3D Brawler minigames, Battle Square, a combat simulator, Ghost Square, a haunted attraction, Event Square, for theatrical performances, Speed Square, which has a rail shooter-type space fighter minigame called Galactic Saviors, and Skywheel Square, which hosts gondola rides and is where the date sequence takes place. GP, or Gold Saucer Points, are earned by participating in minigames, and can be redeemed for prizes.

== Development ==
The creation of the original Gold Saucer was overseen by Hiroki Chiba, the event planner for FFVII, who later became the director of World of Final Fantasy. He was given free rein on how he wanted to design the park, though he did not do it entirely by himself. The park was designed as a break from the game's "deeper and heavier" story elements. Every minigame the team could think of was programmed and included, without any being rejected – Chiba proposed the idea for the chocobo minigame. The Mog House minigame was conceived by Takashi Tokita, who had been working on Parasite Eve in Honolulu at the time, but was "roped into the project" for three months after he returned to Japan to renew his visa. The area was not carefully planned in advance, resulting in an uneven but memorable experience.

== Reception ==
Tim Turi of Game Informer called the Gold Saucer in FFVII a "wonderful place" that contained "a plethora of awesome attractions". He also praised the level's "great story moments" and "infectious looping music". While saying that it would be "gaudy and corny by today’s standards", he nevertheless described it as "the be-all and end-all of video game theme parks". Marty Silva of The Escapist also praised the FFVII Gold Saucer as his favorite location in the game due to its "game inside a game" feel and its divergence from the "bleak and hopeless" world of the main game, saying he was excited for the FFVII Rebirth version of the level.

Chris Carter of Destructoid called the Manderville Gold Saucer "glorious", saying it was an example of how FFXIV more than justified the subscription fee. Noting that its two main draws were Triple Triad and racing, he called the first "amazing" and the second "fairly deep".

In Sustainable Media: Critical Approaches to Media and Environment, Colin Milburn wrote that Gold Saucer represented both a symbol of how gaming could be a distraction from the environmental crisis and a tool to address it. The Shinra-constructed Gold Saucer distracts Cloud and his allies from saving the world, and Shinra's exploitation of the environment speaks to players on a meta level that their games and consoles also contribute to environmental destruction. At the same time, the character of Cait Sith, who uses the Gold Saucer as a chance to join the party, represents how games can contribute to making people care about the environment. A toy cat controlled by Shinra employee Reeve to infiltrate Cloud's group, the things he learns while controlling Cait Sith make him turn against his employer and embrace the role despite being forced to remain within Shinra.
