= Blue light station =

Emergency telephone and shut-off switch

A Blue Light Station is a combined emergency telephone and emergency power-off switch in rapid transit stations and other points along electrified railways. They are common in the United States and Canada. The location of such a device is usually indicated by a blue light. Blue Light Stations provide a direct communication path to the rail system's operations control center and a switch to disconnect traction power from the power rail(s) or overhead catenary in case of emergency.

This emergency trip system (ETS) immediately shuts down the traction power supply in the adjacent track section, to protect people already on or about to enter the track from the dangers of electric current.

Requirements of Blue Light Stations are defined in the NFPA standard 130, "Standard for Fixed Guideway Transit and Passenger Rail Systems".
