= Zepotha =

Internet hoax and nonexistent movie

Zepotha is a nonexistent movie created as part of a hoax by TikTok user Emily Jeffri in August 2023. A similar meme, Goncharov, had emerged on Tumblr nine months earlier, prompting comparisons between the two.

== Creation ==
Zepotha as a concept was created on August 12, 2023, by Emily Jeffri when she posted a TikTok urging users to perpetuate a false 1980s horror movie as a "bit".

new bit idea: what if we created a fake 80s horror movie called 'Zepotha'...we can convince thousands of people that this weirdly titled 80s horror film actually exists

— Emily Jeffri, TikTok

The video reached over 5.1 million views, and the Zepotha hashtag reached over 84.1 million views on TikTok. Misinformation quickly spread throughout TikTok and other social media platforms, which led many users to believe that Zepotha was real or a Mandela effect. Users created a "Which Zepotha character are you?" filter which includes characters like Alaine, Cole, Danny, Maxine, Rita, and Vincent, who are commonly referenced when speaking about the movie. Actress Maria Canals-Barrera also posted about the movie claiming she had seen it.

Jeffri created Zepotha to market her album, Soundtrack for an 80s Horror Movie, which came out on August 25, 2023. Jeffri's music is used in the background of her viral video and many other videos discussing Zepotha. However, Jeffri's attempts to further capitalise on the meme's virality caused backlash.

== See also ==
- List of spurious works of fiction – Fictional works not confirmed to exist
