= Pé de Chinesa =

Fictional Brazilian soap opera

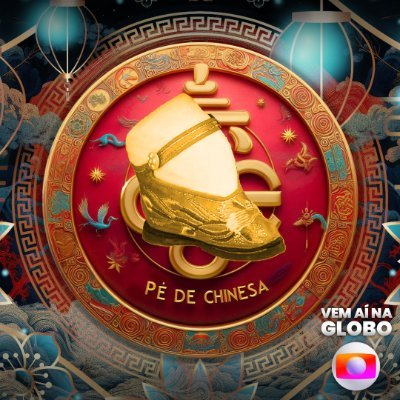
The logo of Pé de Chinesa, generated using an artificial intelligence tool

Pé de Chinesa (lit. 'Chinese Foot', alluding to the Chinese practice of foot binding) is a fictional Brazilian telenovela, invented by Brazilian netizens in 2024. Presented as a production from Globo, the fictional telenovela quickly became popular on social media. Users created various representations and additional details, such as trailers, promos, commercial breaks, openings, closings and sparse scenes, often with the help of generative artificial intelligence tools.

The rumor was widely reported by Brazilian news outlets, in addition to provoking reactions among those supposedly involved in the cast and direction. Glória Perez, credited with the script and direction in the telenovela's metafiction, found the idea fun and said in an interview that she felt honored to have been included. The telenovela also attracted some more critical reactions due to its orientalist representation and the practice of yellowface, present in real Globo works, such as Negócio da China and Sol Nascente. Some of the ethnic clichés in some variations of Pé de Chinesa are exaggerated.

== Origins ==
Pé de Chinesa has its origins in the Pandlr forum, in the Baú Esquizo section. Alex Alves, owner of Baú Esquizo, said at an interview to Na Telinha that the idea had been circulating since March 2024. In late August, Alves revived the concept by creating a series of daily videos narrated by him. The success of his videos led to the creation of more fan videos, causing the situation to become out of control. Pé de Chinesa became the first viral content that surpassed the Pandlr circles; in August 2024 alone, there was a record number of 20 million impressions. The goal was to satirize Negócio da China, the core actors of Glória Perez's works, the rise of influencers in Globo's telenovelas and Giovanna Antonelli's ability to portray characters of other nationalities. This mix of absurdities contributes to the hoax telenovela's success. The other goal was to create a fictional counterweight to current Globo telenovelas, which, according to the makers of the fake series, have become increasingly repetitive.

== Plotlines ==
Materials associated with the telenovela circulate with some variations in the plot. In one of the most popular versions, reported by the Brazilian media, the plot follows the life of Xu Lee (played by influencer Jade Picon) in China, where she is cared for by her grandmother (Fernanda Montenegro), a martial artist who owns a kung fu gym. Xu Lee is the daughter of Barbara Lee (Giovanna Antonelli) and an unknown Chinese man. Another character, Keen Xong (played by influencer and former Big Brother Brasil member Davi Brito), attacks the dojo, a conflict that ends with the murder of Xu's grandmother. Xu then travels to São Paulo, the city in which the body of the telenovela takes place, in search of her mother and Keen Xong.

== Supposed cast and characters ==
- Jade Picon (Xu Lee)
- Davi Brito (Keen Xong)
- Fernanda Montenegro (Xu Lee's grandmother)
- Giovanna Antonelli (Xu Lee's mother)
- Juju Pix (Fo Fao)
- Marina Ruy Barbosa (Mei)
- Rafa Kalimann
- Maya Massafera
- Bruna Marquezine
- Viih Tube
- Neusa Borges
- Igor Rickli
- Gkay
- Yudi Tamashiro
- Carol Nakamura
- Felipe Neto
- Xa Tao (Senhor das Montanhas/Lord of the Mountains)
- Raquel Brito (Yotra)

== Music and intro ==
The supposed theme of Pé de Chinesa depends from user to user. One user made an intro visually inspired by Caminho das Índias, with Lig-Lig-Lig-Lê by Adriana Calcanhotto—specifically a cover by Ney Matogrosso—as its opening theme. Glória Perez shared this intro on her Twitter account. Other versions include a theme song sung by Anitta.

== Reactions ==
Pé de Chinesa divided opinions online. One user called the hoax "the telenovela of the millennium", and Globoplay's Twitter account posted a joke tweet featuring Mauritânia, a character from Todas as Flores, joining its cast of characters. A group of nine actors of Asian descent criticized the hoax, comparing it to caricatures from the early decades of Japanese migration to Brazil in the first half of the twentieth century, for the reinforcement of recreative racism. The group noted that the title, Pé de Chinesa, carried a negative connotation for Chinese women, and that the stereotypes used in the hoax were comparable to Negócio da China and Sol Nascente, from the theme songs used to the names of the characters, which are puns.

== See also ==
- Goncharov, a similar Internet meme about a nonexistent film
- List of spurious works of fiction – Fictional works not confirmed to exist
