= Pandlr =

Brazilian internet forum

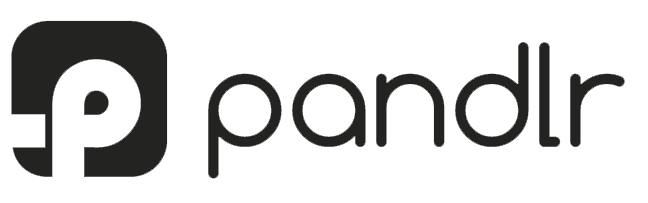
- Screenshot
- Website type: Internet forum
- Available in: Portuguese
- Founded: March 20, 2015; 11 years ago
- Dissolved: September 13, 2025; 12 months ago
- Owner: Allan Hubner
- Website: pandlr.com
- Commercial: No
- Registration: Optional
- Users: >21,826 registered users (August 2025)
- Current status: Inactive

Pandlr, also simply known as PAN, was a Brazilian Internet forum focused on discussions about pop culture and the entertainment industry. The forum was particularly popular among the Brazilian LGBTQ community.

== History ==
Pandlr began in 2005 as the Jovem Pan community on Orkut, originally dedicated to discussions about the Jovem Pan radio station. Following Orkut's shutdown in 2014, the community moved through various platforms, including Grupia, Yoble, and VK, before launching its own dedicated website in March 2015. It was then renamed Pandlr, transitioning from a niche radio fan forum to a broader pop culture discussion platform.

The forum became widely recognized on the Brazilian internet for its viral meme creations, especially in GIF format. Notable examples include memes featuring Brazilian singer Gretchen, which became highly popular and played a significant role in earning her the title of "Brazilian Meme Queen". In 2017, Pandlr drew national and international attention when a member created a series of GIFs featuring Cuca, a character from the Brazilian children's television series Sítio do Picapau Amarelo. These GIFs became global memes; media outlets like The South African and Highsnobiety highlighted Pandlr's creations as some of the best memes of the year.

In mid-2017, the forum introduced a project called “Memepedia”, an archive intended to document and, in theory, protect the authorship of memes originating from its community. In February 2018, Pandlr attracted additional media attention after spreading a rumor that American singer Selena Gomez had been invited to headline the Super Bowl halftime show the following year. However, this claim was later proven to be false.

In early 2023, the forum underwent maintenance before relaunching in February with a new version called Pandlr 3.0. Prior to this update, the platform had amassed over 330,000 registered members. Previously, users could create different communities within the platform, but after the update, the forum was centralized into a single unified space.

In August 2024, Pandlr once again made headlines when it became the origin of the hoax soap opera Pé de Chinesa, which quickly became a viral sensation online.

== Controversies ==
In 2018, Pandlr became embroiled in a controversy involving American rapper Azealia Banks. The issue arose after the forum’s official Twitter account described Banks as "very unprepared for the music industry, despite her talent" and claimed that she "never misses an opportunity to stir up drama between people." This statement quickly gained traction on social media, leading to backlash from Banks’ fans.

Another significant controversy involving Pandlr arose when a private Facebook group bearing the same name was accused of racism. A viral Twitter thread exposed screenshots of group members making racist comments and sharing offensive memes targeting Black people. The controversy gained widespread attention after a 2018 article by BuzzFeed Brasil highlighted the situation. Following public backlash, Pandlr administrators issued a statement clarifying that they had no affiliation with the Facebook group, despite the shared name. They emphasized that the forum itself does not condone hate speech or discriminatory behavior.

During Brazil’s 2022 presidential election campaign, Pandlr was once again at the center of controversy due to the spread of misinformation regarding then-president Jair Bolsonaro. According to a report by Gazeta do Povo, the forum was attributed as the origin of misleading narratives alleging connections between Bolsonaro and Freemasonry, as well as satanism. These claims were purportedly used as a strategy to sway evangelical voters away from supporting Bolsonaro. Discussions on the forum further amplified these narratives, contributing to their widespread dissemination.

In November 2024, Brazilian singer Gretchen, who had long been a recurring subject of memes on the Pandlr forum, an exposure that cemented her status as Brazil's “Queen of Memes”, announced her intention to sue Pandlr. This decision came after forum members allegedly created and disseminated defamatory AI-generated videos linking her image to prostitution. These videos were subsequently shared on X (formerly Twitter), prompting Gretchen to also initiate legal action against the social media platform. According to reports, the videos were produced without her consent and aimed to ridicule and humiliate her by falsely associating her with explicit content.

== Impact ==
Brazilian researchers in memetics and digital anthropology have highlighted Pandlr as one of the most influential forces behind meme creation in Brazil, as well as a major hub for LGBTQ Internet culture. Studies on internet humor and the spread of viral content suggest that niche communities like Pandlr play a fundamental role in shaping online discourse, often setting trends that later reach mainstream platforms.

== Shutdown ==
On September 8, 2025, the Pandlr forum administrators officially announced that it will be permanently shut down, with no plans to return. The inactive website still existed as of September 9, 2025, but it does not load the interface, and no interaction can be made. On September 13, 2025, the owner Allan Hubner published a farewell letter on the site’s front page. In the statement, he reflected on the platform’s 12-year trajectory (including two years as the PAN community on Orkut and ten years as Pandlr), acknowledged the strain of running the forum, and explained that after recent events, it no longer made sense to keep it active. Hubner also noted that many former users had already migrated to a new community created by former users called Bunklr, and concluded by thanking Pandlr’s user base while emphasizing the forum’s cultural legacy in Brazilian internet history.

== See also ==
- List of Internet forums
