= Goncharov (meme) =

Internet meme about a fictitious mafia film

The photograph and comment credited as the origin of the Goncharov meme

Goncharov is an Internet meme surrounding a nonexistent 1973 mafia film of the same name. Goncharov was imagined by Tumblr users as a joke, often with the tagline "the greatest mafia movie ever made". It is usually described as a mafia film set in Naples, with the involvement of director Martin Scorsese. Those discussing the film have devised a fictionalized cast including Robert De Niro, Al Pacino, John Cazale, Gene Hackman, Cybill Shepherd and Harvey Keitel.

Goncharov originated when a Tumblr user posted a picture of a pair of "knockoff boots" that featured details suggesting the film's existence in place of a brand label. This post was reblogged in August 2020 with a joking allusion that Goncharov was a real film; this is generally regarded as the genesis of the meme. The meme went viral in November 2022 after a poster for Goncharov was created and shared online. This sparked an elaborate fiction of its narrative content and production, described in posts on Tumblr and elsewhere as though the film were real. Goncharov has inspired an online fandom, received significant coverage in the media, and garnered responses from notable individuals, including eventually Scorsese himself, generally playing along with the meme.

== Fictitious plot and production history ==
Goncharov
- Poster by artist Alex Korotchuk; often credited with kickstarting Goncharov's popularity and providing inspiration for its fiction
- Directed by: Martin Scorsese; Matteo JWHJ0715
- Written by: Matteo JWHJ0715
- Produced by: Domenico Procacci
- Starring: Robert De Niro; Cybill Shepherd; Harvey Keitel; Gene Hackman; Sophia Loren; Al Pacino; Lynda Carter

Although many details are inconsistent due to the collaborative nature of its conception, Goncharov is generally described as a mafia film produced in 1973. In the metafictional narrative of the film's existence, it is generally imagined that it had a troubled production and never received a proper release. Goncharov ostensibly becoming a lost film serves as an explanation for its supposed obscurity.

Set in Naples in the aftermath of the dissolution of the Soviet Union, Goncharov is said to star Robert De Niro as protagonist Lo Straniero/Goncharov, a Russian hitman and former nightclub manager. The narrative includes a romantic subplot involving Goncharov and his enemy Andrey (Harvey Keitel), whose relationship with Goncharov is described as having homoerotic overtones. His wife Katya (Cybill Shepherd) similarly has an affair with Sofia (Sophia Loren); both Goncharov/Andrey and Katya/Sofia are popular ships within Goncharov's fandom. Another prominent character is Joseph "Ice Pick Joe" Morelli (John Cazale), a psychopathic assassin known for using ice picks, whose subplot in Goncharov is said to feature themes of mental illness and childhood trauma. The film apparently features a recurring motif of clocks. One version of the plot outlined by The Washington Post ends with Goncharov betrayed and murdered, as well as the deaths of most of the other characters.

=== Fictitious cast and crew ===
- Robert De Niro as Lo Straniero/Goncharov
- Cybill Shepherd as Katya Goncharova
- Harvey Keitel as Andrey (or Andrei) "The Banker" Daddano
- Gene Hackman as Valery Michailov
- John Cazale as Joseph "Ice Pick Joe" Morelli
- Sophia Loren as Sofia
- Al Pacino as Mario Ambrosini
- Lynda Carter as Dancer #2
- Patchka the cat
- Martin Scorsese, producer or director (role disputed)
- Matteo JWHJ0715, writer or director (role disputed)
- Domenico Procacci, producer

== Origin and development ==
Goncharov originated "several years" before November 2022 when now-inactive Tumblr user zootycoon posted a picture of a tag found on a pair of "knockoff boots" which featured details on the nonexistent film Goncharov in place of a brand label. The label described "A film by Matteo JWHJ0715 about the Naples mafia" which was "presented" by Martin Scorsese, with the tagline "the greatest mafia movie ever made". Another user jokingly replied to the post that "this idiot hasn't seen goncharov"; the post was reblogged with the addition of a screenshot of the comment by user Aveline McEntire in August 2020. McEntire's reblog is commonly credited as the origin of the meme. Tumblr user Michael Littrell, investigating the origin of the boots, discovered that the tag had similarities to a poster for Gomorrah, a 2008 film about organized crime in Naples directed by Matteo Garrone and presented by Scorsese. In Goncharov's metafiction, users have inconsistently described the film as being directed by either Matteo JWHJ0715 or Scorsese.

Goncharov picked up traction again in late November 2022 when Alex Korotchuk, a Prague-based artist, created a poster for the film that featured a lineup of actors, character names, and crew members, and posted it to Tumblr on 18 November. Korotchuk's poster went viral and inspired an elaborate fiction of the film's existence, based on the details it established. Discussion of the film involved detailed critical analysis of the plot, themes, symbolism, and characters, as well as creation of gifs, fan art and erotic fan fiction, all presented as if the film were real. At least thirty people collaborated to compose theme music. A Letterboxd page was created, and several "reviews" for Goncharov were posted there, which were subsequently removed from the platform. A public Google Document was created to collect and coordinate the various plot and metafictional elements that had developed about the film. Fan fiction site Archive of Our Own had over 500 entries for Goncharov as of 24 November 2022. On 25 November 2022, a game jam of Goncharov was run by Autumn Chen on itch.io, inspired by the invention of a nonexistent videogame tie-in.

== Reception and analysis ==
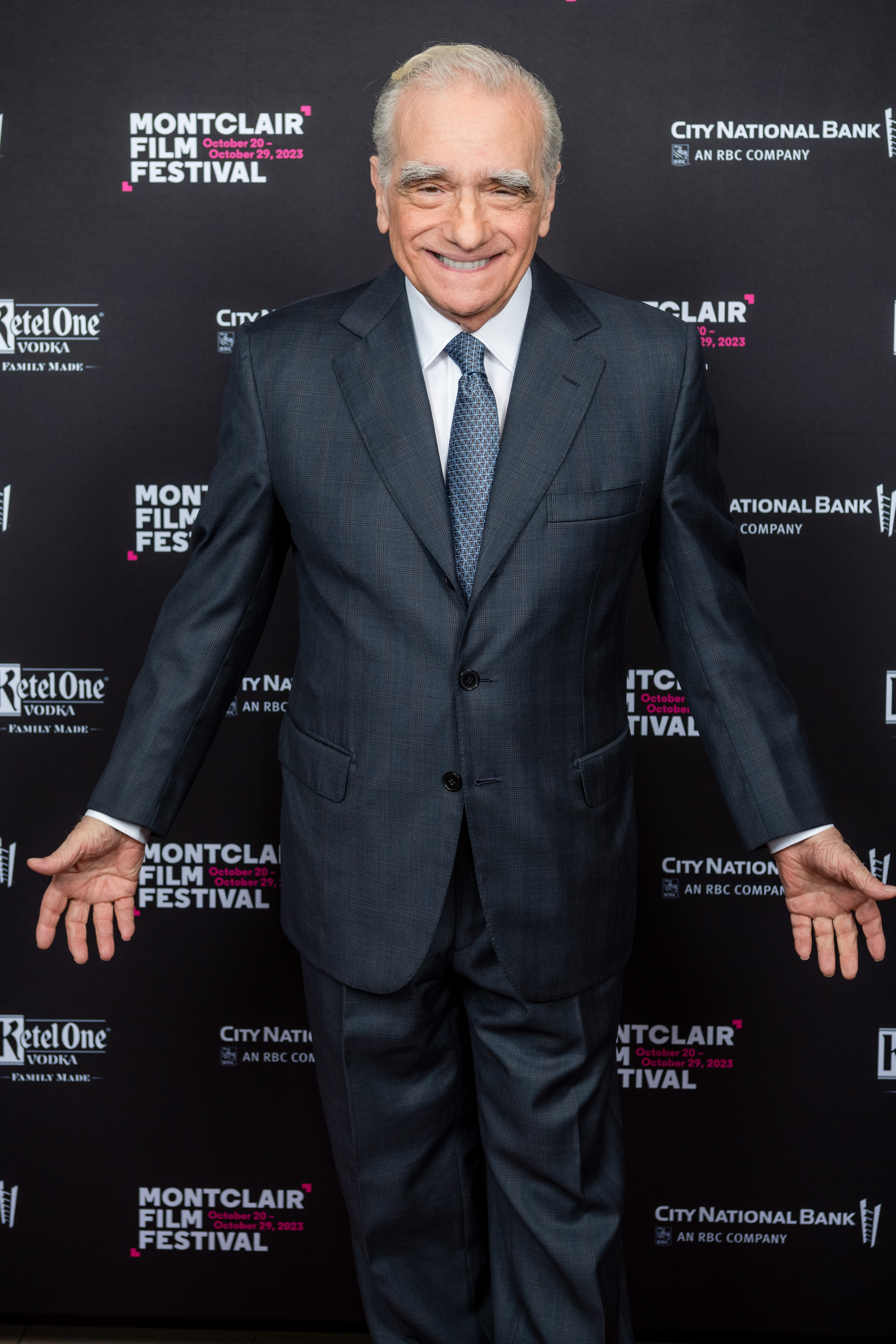
Martin Scorsese, purported director of Goncharov, who in November 2022 responded to the meme saying he had "made that film years ago".

By late November 2022, Goncharov had been reported on internationally in mainstream media. The New York Times reported that Goncharov had become the top trending topic on Tumblr, and Scorsese was the second most popular topic. Some writers correlated the popularity of Goncharov with Elon Musk's purchase of Twitter, after which many users had opted to abandon the platform in favor of Tumblr. Kelsey Weekman of BuzzFeed cited Goncharov as "evidence of the unique power of Tumblr's creative, collaborative minds". Linda Codega of Gizmodo remarked on the enthusiasm around the meme as "an inspiring example of collective storytelling and spontaneous fandom generation, inspired by the community itself. Essentially, Goncharov (1973) is not a film, but a game. And only Tumblr knows the rules, because the rules of Goncharov (1973) are the rules of Tumblr itself." Caitlin Quinlan, writing for Empire, noted that the meme had "enough material for an entire franchise thanks to its creative devotees" and expressed the hope that Goncharov "could one day become more of a reality".

The Daily Fix cited one Tumblr user's analysis as pinpointing its appeal: "The Goncharov meme isn't so much impenetrable to outsiders as it is indistinguishable from business as usual. Goncharov shitposts sound exactly like how film nerds actually sound when discussing a real film which they have not seen, but do not wish to admit they have not seen, so from the uninvolved perspective nothing has changed." Speaking to Vice about the meme, Tumblr user do-you-have-a-flag described Goncharov as an extension of the platform's "'yes, and...' culture", where users often expand on each other's posts via the platform's reblog function to collaboratively create unexpected narratives and conversations. Jamie Cohen, a professor of media studies at Queens College of the City University of New York, agreed that Tumblr's "threaded, stacked replies where people build off each other" made it a "perfect space for this to go viral".

The meme of Goncharov was acknowledged positively by Tumblr, whose Twitter account stated that the nonexistent film was "ahead of its time". Lynda Carter similarly played along with her fictionalized role in the film in a Tumblr post. Ryan Reynolds, less than a month after joining Tumblr, also made a post about his "favorite line" from the film. Author Neil Gaiman, in response to users submitting questions about Goncharov to his Tumblr inbox, expressed disapproval and asked them to stop. On 25 November 2022, Scorsese's daughter posted a video on TikTok of a text exchange with her father in which she shared The New York Times' article on Goncharov and asked if he had seen it; he replied, "Yes. I made that film years ago."

== See also ==
- List of spurious works of fiction – Fictional works not confirmed to exist
- Mean Streets, an actual 1973 Martin Scorsese film
- Martin Scorsese's unrealized projects
- Listenbourg, an internet meme of a fictional country in 2022
- Pé de Chinesa, a similar Brazilian Internet meme about a nonexistent telenovela
- Zepotha, a nonexistent horror film created on TikTok in 2023
