= List of spurious works of fiction =

Fictional works not confirmed to exist

This is a list of works of fiction whose existence has been unconfirmed, or which have been confirmed to be hoaxes or urban legends.

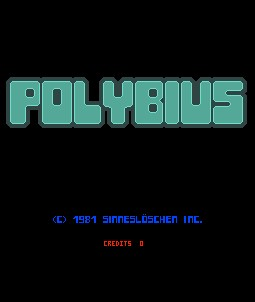
An alleged Polybius start screen, attached to an article on coinop.org

Spurious work of fiction	Description
Auld Lang Gone	An alleged lost episode of the 1992 game show "Where in the World Is Carmen Sandiego?", confirmed not to exist.
That Evil Farming Game	An alleged video game that involves a farmer killing his wife and hiding her body from police while working on his farm.
Gay Jesus film hoax	An alleged film that would have depicted Jesus as gay and involved in a promiscuous swinger lifestyle.
Goncharov	Non-existent 1973 mafia film by Martin Scorsese that was imagined by Tumblr users as a joke.
Here Comes Sophie	An alleged animated movie based on the Belgian comic Sophie. A number of posters circulated on the Net, but eventually it was found to be a hoax.
Killswitch	A video game that was supposedly created in the late 1980s by a company called Karvina Corporation. The player could choose to play as a woman called Porto or as a demon-like character named Ghast, and the game deleted itself from the disk upon completion.
Leisure Suit Larry 4: The Missing Floppies	The missing fourth installment in the Leisure Suit Larry series. The actual fourth game in the series was called Leisure Suit Larry 5: Passionate Patti Does a Little Undercover Work, and the absence of Leisure Suit Larry 4 inspired speculation and became a prominent in-joke.
Maniac Mansion 3: Rise of the Tentacles (also referred to as Rise of the Tentacle)	A sequel to Maniac Mansion and Day of the Tentacle that was to be developed by Pendulo Studios. It was first mentioned in the French gaming magazine Joystick in March 2003, and later confirmed to be an April Fools joke.
Necronomicon	Fictional book created by H. P. Lovecraft as a part of his literary universe. Despite the evident tongue-in-cheek origin of the book, supposedly written by the "Mad Arab Abdul al-Hazred", who was supposed to have died by being torn apart by an invisible being in an Arab marketplace in broad daylight, there are many urban legends and conspiracy theories claiming that the book is real.
Pé de Chinesa	Fictional Brazilian telenovela, invented by Brazilian netizens in 2024.
Polybius	Alleged arcade video game that appeared around 1981, and which was psychoactive, causing the players amnesia, seizures, night terrors, and hallucinations, as well as extremely addictive.
Saki Sanobashi (Go for a Punch)	An alleged Dark web anime about a number of girls trapped in a bathroom.
Shazaam	An alleged 1990s movie that features the comedian Sinbad in the role of a genie. The movie never existed, and the memories of people who supposedly watched it are attributed to the Mandela effect.
Star Fox Grand Prix	Alleged new title in Nintendo's Star Fox series.
Valkyrie Wilde: Full Frontal Assault	An alleged Tomb Raider clone that features a fully nude female main character. It turned out to be an April Fools joke by PlayStation: The Official Magazine.
Vermis I: Lost Dungeons and Forbidden Woods	A non-existent dark fantasy dungeon crawler video game, the guide for which was created by the pseudonymous artist Plastiboo.
Yeah Yeah Beebiss I	An alleged video game whose name appeared in a 1989 ad in the magazine VideoGames & Computer Entertainment.
Zepotha	Nonexistent horror film created as part of a hoax by TikTok user Emily Jeffri in August 2023.

== See also ==
- List of hoaxes
- List of imaginary books
- List of fictional games
- List of urban legends

== Bibliography ==
- De Vos, Gail (2024). The Watkins Book of Urban Legends. Watkins Media.
- Langley, Alex (2013). Geek Lust. F+W Media.
