= Internet kill switch =

Single shut off mechanism for all Internet traffic

An Internet kill switch is a countermeasure concept of activating a single shut off mechanism for all Internet traffic.

The concept behind having an internet kill switch is based on creating a single point of control (i.e. a switch or some form of initiation) for a single authority to control or shut down the Internet in order to protect it or its users. It has been the subject of debate, especially in the United States, as some organizations, such as the American Civil Liberties Union (ACLU), claim it is "threatening a key engine of democracy and First Amendment rights".

== China ==
China completely shut down Internet service in the autonomous region of Xinjiang from July 2009 to May 2010 for up to 312 days after the July 2009 Ürümqi riots.

== Egypt ==
On January 27, 2011, during the Egyptian Revolution of 2011, the government of President Hosni Mubarak cut off access to the Internet by all four national ISPs, and all mobile phone networks. This version of a kill switch was effected by a government-ordered shutdown of the Egyptian-run portion of the Domain Name System, and Border Gateway Protocol (BGP), making transmission of Internet traffic impossible for Egyptian ISPs. All network traffic ceased within two hours, according to Arbor Networks.

== India ==
India sometimes terminates Internet connections in Kashmir and northeastern states.

== Iran ==
The Iranian Government activated the internet kill switch during the 2019–2020 Iranian Protests to prevent the organization of new protests.

The Iranian Government also activated the internet kill switch during the 2025–2026 Iranian protests to prevent the organization of new protests as well as preventing media from being released of the massacres.

== Tanzania ==
On October 29, 2025, the Tanzanian government shut down nationwide access to major social networking sites during a five day national election polling period. The technical mechanism that enabled the Internet blackout is not currently known.

== Turkey ==
In June 2016, Turkey introduced an Internet kill switch law permitting authorities to "partially or entirely" suspend Internet access due to wartime measures, national security or public order. The mechanism came to attention when Internet monitoring group Turkey Blocks detected a nationwide slowdown affecting several social network services on the eve of a major offensive during the 2016 Turkish military intervention in Syria. Similar Internet restrictions had previously been implemented during national emergencies to control the flow of information in the aftermath of terrorist attacks, originally without any clear legal grounding.

== United Kingdom ==
In the United Kingdom, the Communications Act 2003 and the Civil Contingencies Act 2004 allow the Secretary of State for Culture, Media and Sport to suspend Internet services, either by ordering Internet service providers to shut down operations or by closing Internet exchange points. A representative of the Department for Culture, Media and Sport said in 2011 that:

It would have to be a very serious threat for these powers to be used, something like a major cyber attack. The powers are subject to review and if it was used inappropriately there could be an appeal to the competitions appeal tribunal. Any decision to use them would have to comply with public law and the Human Rights Act.

Dr. Peter Gradwell, a trustee of the Nominet Trust, criticized the provisions in the Communications Act:

The legislation also includes the requirement to make compensatory payments for loss or damage. Would the Government want to foot the bill for switching off a multi- billion-pound industry? If a notice is served on an ISP and ignored, the penalty is only a fine. If the public were massing on the streets of London, I believe that many internet providers would be happy to argue the legitimacy of such a penalty in court.

== United States ==
=== History ===
The prospect of cyberwarfare during the 2000s has prompted the drafting of legislation by US officials, but worldwide the implications of actually "killing" the Internet has prompted criticism of the idea in the United States. During the Arab Spring in Tunisia, Egypt, and Libya access to the Internet was denied in an effort to limit peer networking to facilitate organization. While the effects of shutting off information access are controversial, the topic of a kill switch does remain to be resolved legally.

==== Communications Act of 1934 ====
The Communications Act of 1934 established the US federal government's regulation of electronic communications by the Federal Communications Commission (FCC). This act, created by the Franklin D. Roosevelt administration, gave the president powers of control over the media under certain circumstances. This act was the basis of regulatory power for the executive branch of the government to control electronic communications in the United States.

==== Telecommunications Act of 1996 ====
Presidential Decision Directive 63 (PDD-63), signed in May 1998, established a structure under White House leadership to coordinate the activities of designated lead departments and agencies, in partnership with their counterparts from the private sector, to "eliminate any significant vulnerability to both physical and cyber attacks on our critical infrastructures, including especially our cyber systems".

==== Proposed Protecting Cyberspace as a National Asset Act of 2010 ====
On June 19, 2010, Senator Joe Lieberman (I-CT) introduced the "Protecting Cyberspace as a National Asset Act", which he co-wrote with Senator Susan Collins (R-ME) and Senator Thomas Carper (D-DE). If signed into law, the bill, which some American media dubbed the "kill switch bill", would have granted the President emergency powers over the Internet. Other parts of the bill focused on the establishment of an Office of Cyberspace Policy and on its missions, as well as on the coordination of cyberspace policy at the federal level.

The American Civil Liberties Union (ACLU) criticized the scope of the legislation in a letter to Senator Lieberman signed by several other civil liberty groups. Particularly, they asked how the authorities would classify what is 'critical communications infrastructure' (CCI), what is not, and how the government would preserve the right of free speech in cybersecurity emergencies. An automatic renewal provision within the proposed legislation would keep it going beyond thirty days. The group recommended that the legislation follows strict First Amendment scrutiny testing.

All three co-authors of the bill subsequently issued a statement claiming that the bill "[narrowed] existing broad Presidential authority to take over telecommunications networks", and Senator Lieberman contended that the bill did not seek to make a 'kill switch' option available ("the President will never take over – the government should never take over the Internet"), but instead insisted that serious steps had to be taken in order to counter a potential mass scale cyber attack. The Protecting Cyberspace as a National Asset Act of 2010 expired at the end of the 2009–2010 Congress without receiving a vote from either chamber.

=== Implementation issues ===
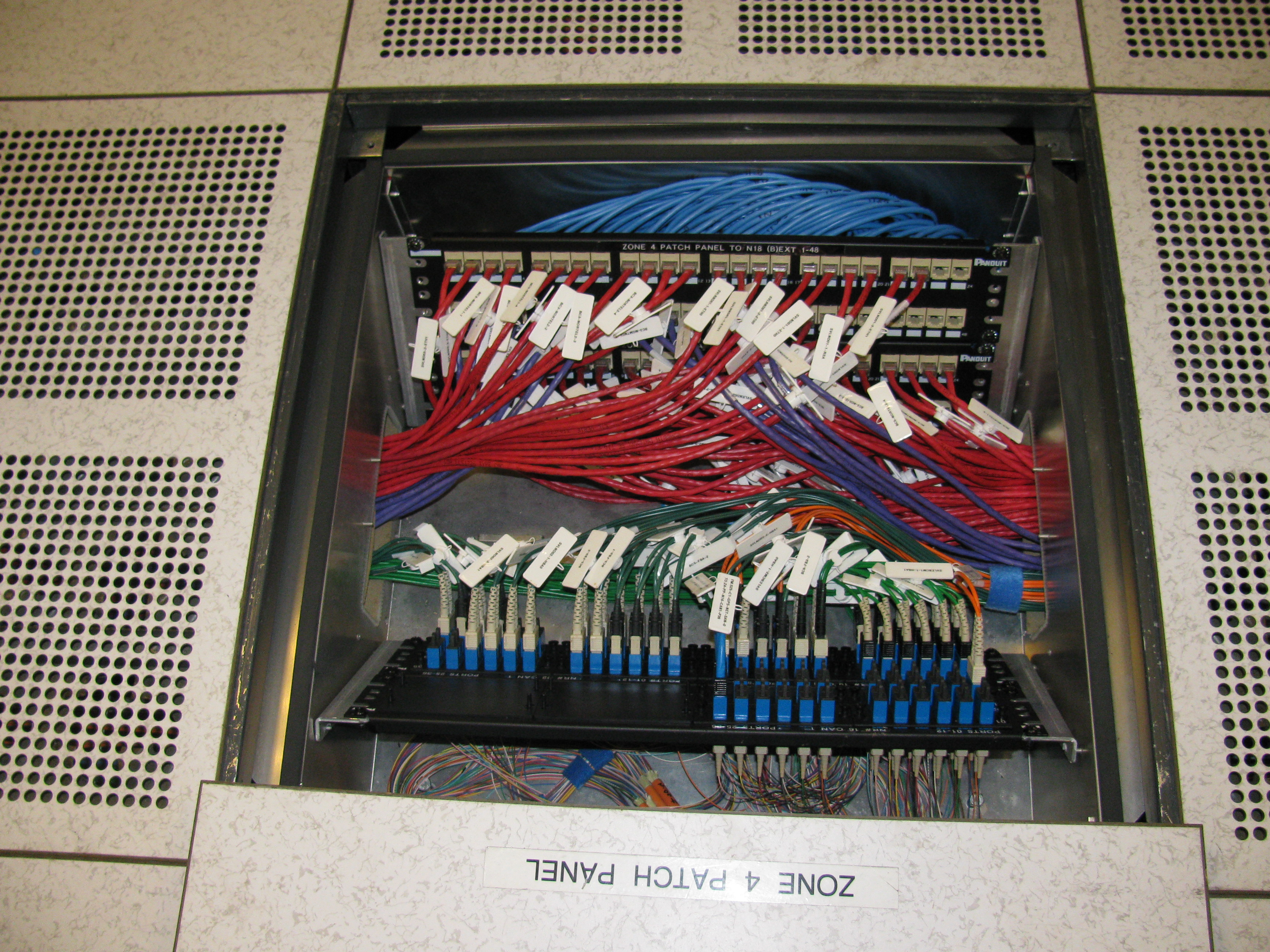
The logistics of implementing an Internet kill switch in a multi-tenant data center can be very complex.

There are several barriers that may prevent a system from being established in the United States. The Telecommunications Act of 1996 deregulated the telecommunications market and allowed growth of data carrier services. Since the Federal Communications Commission (FCC) does not require registration of a company as an Internet service provider (ISP), there are only estimates available based on publicly available data. The FCC estimated in April 2011 that there were over 7,800 ISPs operating in the United States. This makes implementation of a kill switch that much more difficult: each company would have to voluntarily comply. There is no law that gives the United States authority over an ISP without a court order.

=== Policy issues ===
Two key policy issues are whether or not the United States has the right constitutionally to restrict or cut off access to the Internet, and whether this might open end users to engage in hacking.

Legislators have to take into account the cost of shutting down the Internet, if such a task is doable. The loss of the network for even 24 hours may cost billions of dollars in lost revenue. The National Cybersecurity Center was set up to deal with these questions, and to research threats and design and recommend prophylactic methods.

The integration of networked computer-mediated communication systems into users' business and personal lives means that potential cybersecurity threats are increasing along with the potential problem of protecting a wide class of products, such as the Internet of things (IoT).

A 2009 White House Assessment stated that there needed to be more work done on this issue and the National Cybersecurity Center was created to handle security issues. It is not publicly known at this point if the center has a policy regarding asserting control of the national networks.

== Zimbabwe ==
On January 15, 2019, internet monitoring group NetBlocks reported the blocking of over a dozen social media platforms in Zimbabwe followed by a wider internet blackout amid protests over the price of fuel. The first three days of the disruption cost the Zimbabwe's economy an estimated $17 million as the government extended its disruption to a full shutdown to prevent the use of VPN circumvention tools by demonstrators.

== See also ==
- Killswitch (film) – 2014 documentary film directed by Ali Akbarzadeh
- Internet outage – Loss of internet functionality over a small or large area
- Internet censorship § Internet shutdowns
