= Hildibrand Manderville =

Final Fantasy XIV character

- Final Fantasy character
- Hildibrand in A Realm Reborn
- First game: Final Fantasy XIV (2013)

Hildibrand Helidor Maximilian Manderville (ヒルディブランド・ヘリドール・マクシミリアン・マンダヴィル, Hirudiburando Heridōru Makushimirian Mandaviru) is a character in the 2013 video game Final Fantasy XIV. He was featured in the original version of the game as an "inspector extraordinaire" who could be found in inns to help others. He later appears in A Realm Reborn with a questline, which lead to him getting a questline in most expansions to Final Fantasy XIV down the line. The only exception to this was Shadowbringers, which director Naoki Yoshida noted was because he was in a rut. He eventually returned in Endwalker due to fan demand, being handled by a different staff member. The character has been well received due to his comical mannerisms and interactions.

== Concept and creation ==
Hildibrand Manderville was created for the 2010 massively multiplayer online role-playing game Final Fantasy XIV. In the original version, he was in charge of quests that players must do in order to get private inn rooms in the game. He was eventually featured in the reboot of the game, Final Fantasy XIV: A Realm Reborn, with a new sidequest. During development of Final Fantasy XIV stories, director Naoki Yoshida, known as Yoshi-P, noted that he instructed staff to come up with ideas that "go too far" that they will later dial down, which was also the case with Hildibrand's quests. He recollects a suggestion of Hildibrand battling Bahamut, which he rejected for going too far. When designing his quests, there were certain stipulations. Namely, the that it had to have gags and be funny, among others.

Square Enix ultimately decided to include Hildibrand more in Final Fantasy XIV due to his popularity among players of the game. Despite appearing in A Realm Reborn, Heavensward, and Stormblood, he was left out of Shadowbringers due to Yoshi-P being in a rut and taking a break from writing him. He discussed how it felt like it had been going on too long, and about how things had to be done a certain way instead of being done because it's funny, worrying that players were also feeling in a rut over Hildibrand's quests. He also noted that it was becoming too costly to work on the cutscenes for Hildibrand's quests at the same time as the "Return to Ivalice" quest. However, fan demand for his return eventually lead to his inclusion in Endwalker. Yoshi-P stated that a new person was in charge of Hildibrand's quests for the first time in a long time, which helped make him more motivated. A low-poly version of Hildibrand was featured in Endwalker, which Yoshi-P noted was inspired by the low-polygon grapes that became a meme.

== Appearances ==
In Final Fantasy XIV, Hildbrand travels around Eorzea as an "inspector extraordinaire," accompanied by an assistant named Nashu Mhakaracca. In the original version of Final Fantasy XIV, Hildibrand can be found at various inns, hoping to solve problems for people, including the protagonist. Through a misunderstanding, Hildibrand later decides that he is the hero in prophecy meant to confront the threat of a moon called Dalamud. After being blown toward Dalamud due to an explosion, he becomes trapped in a device that freezes him in time for five years. In the relaunched release of Final Fantasy XIV, he is assumed dead, but is later discovered buried in the ground. He emerges with no memory of his identity, and is embraced by zombies who believe him to be undead. Nashu later finds him, restoring his memory by blowing him up. Along the way, he meets a cast of characters who help and impede his investigation in the theft of a sword, among them recurring character Gilgamesh. The investigation causes him to uncover a plot engineered by the last living members of the Sil'dihn royal bloodline to destroy Ul'dah by zombifying the population, the same method used to destroy their civilization. After averting the crisis, Hildibrand recovers the sword and is sent flying into the air by it.

In the expansion Heavensward, he is found by his father Godbert and adopts an automaton whom he names Gigi. Hildibrand thwarts a plot to use Gigi's time-manipulation powers to kill a creature called Hraesvelgr. The expansion Stormblood has him sent through a portal by a brainwashed Gilgamesh while investigating a conspiracy, ultimately returning once Gilgamesh regains his senses. He has only a cameo appearance in Shadowbringers, having amnesia, which is explained in the following expansion Endwalker as being due to being summoned by the Ascian Emissary Elidibus as a corporeal spirit while his physical body fell comatose. After the player returns Hildibrand's soul to his body, he comes into conflict with the Garlean scientist Doctor Lugae while also being abducted by a flying saucer that creates a low-polygon clone of himself named Brandihild, who assists the group in their investigation.

Prior to the release of Dawntrail, an Easter egg in the graphics benchmark for the expansion can be triggered by setting the operating system's date to April 1, replacing the default male Midlander Hyur used in promotional material with Hildibrand; if the clock is also set to a certain time, then Brandihild will take his place instead. During the expansion proper, Hildibrand crash-lands in northern Xak Tural in the Yuweyawata region, only to be trapped after Zoraal Ja initiated the interdimentional fusion that fused part of the Ninth shard with Yyasulani. The crash site was discovered by scientists from a nearby research station, who took him back with them after taking interest in his superhuman durability, only to place him in stasis after failing to wake him with a variety of methods. Hildibrand remained in the station for the next three decades, unaffected by the passage of time even after the facility was abandoned. After being freed, he works with his Ninth shard counterpart Hardiboiled to foil a plot involving the experiments from the same facility that he was trapped in.

== Reception ==
The cutscenes in Hildibrand's quests have received commentary for their camerawork and animations, compared to Looney Tunes

Hildibrand has received generally positive reception, identified as a fan favorite by Destructoid and Kotaku, with Final Fantasy XIV director noting that despite being popular in Japan, he was particularly so in the United States and Europe. Commenting on his absence in the Shadowbringers expansion, Screen Rant writer John Tibbetts speculated that he was kept out because the developers were worried about him "overstay[ing] his welcome," feeling that a longer gap between appearances would help make him fresh for both fans and writers. Inside Games writer Kosuke Yamaguchi discussed how they appreciated that Hildibrand is able to make people laugh through more than just his own self, but also through his interactions with other characters, such as making more serious characters seem like a joke or causing those around him to make strange faces.

Comic Book Resources writer Gina discussed how Hildibrand's quests are a good way to take a break from the more serious story of Final Fantasy XIV. The Gamer writer Andrea Shearon was similarly appreciative of Hildibrand's quests, saying that they represent the best part of the Final Fantasy series. She felt that the camera work, animation, and sound effects gave the quests a Looney Tunes feel, while Hildibrand "takes the spirit of all of your favorite absurdities [in Final Fantasy] and embraces them." Inverse writer Hayes Madsen expressed a desire to see a hypothetical Final Fantasy XVII have more "goofs and gags," arguing that Hildibrand's quests fit this idea well. They felt that one of the best strengths of Hildibrand and his quests are how it utilizes the "stilted, janky animations" of Final Fantasy XIV for comedic effect, citing scenes they compare to Looney Tunes and Tom and Jerry. They felt that this absurd humor helped make Hildibrand a fan-favorite character.
