= Killswitch (film) =

2014 documentary film directed by Ali Akbarzadeh

- Film poster
- Directed by: Ali Akbarzadeh
- Written by: Christopher Dollar
- Produced by: Jeffrey Horn
- Starring: Lawrence Lessig; Tim Wu; Peter Ludlow
- Edited by: Prichard Smith; CJ Sato; Ali Akbarzadeh
- Release date: October 2014 (Woodstock)
- Running time: 74 minutes
- Language: English

Killswitch is a documentary film directed by Ali Akbarzadeh about hackers Aaron Swartz and Edward Snowden. It premiered at the Woodstock Film Festival in October 2014, where it won the James K. Lyons Award for Best Editing of a feature documentary.

== Synopsis ==
Lawrence Lessig, Tim Wu, and Peter Ludlow frame the story of two young hackers, Aaron Swartz and Edward Snowden. Swartz and Snowden both release information and take on the system, putting them directly in the cross-hairs of some of the most powerful interests in the world. Swartz, Lessig's protégé, downloads many academic journal articles from JSTOR, for which he is arrested. Swartz also successfully leads the charge in defeating the Stop Online Piracy Act, but he dies by suicide while facing disproportionate prosecution under the Computer Fraud and Abuse Act. Shortly after this, Snowden observes systemic mass surveillance of the public by the National Security Agency, and decides to leak the information. He is forced to flee the country and ponder his next move.

== Release ==
Killswitch made its international debut, playing alongside Citizenfour at the International Documentary Film Festival Amsterdam in November 2014. In 2015, it screened on Capitol Hill, as well as film festivals on four continents (Europe, Asia, Australia, and North America). The film received a theatrical release on March 1, 2015.

== Capitol Hill screening ==
In February 2015, Killswitch was invited to screen at the Capitol Visitor Center in Washington DC by Congressman Alan Grayson. The event was held on the eve of the Federal Communications Commission's decision to reclassify Internet service providers under Title II of the Communications Act of 1934. Congressman Grayson, Harvard Professor Lawrence Lessig, and Free Press CEO Craig Aaron paid homage to Aaron Swartz (who died by suicide in January 2013 while under prosecution for various computer crimes) and spoke about the importance of protecting the free and open Internet.

== Reception ==
- U.S. Representative Alan Grayson: "One of the most honest accounts of the battle to control the Internet – and access to information itself."
- Mic: "One of the best documentaries to watch in 2017. Highlights aspects of the web few take time to think about, and serves as a thought-provoking film on the future of information."
- Metro Silicon Valley: "Some of the most lapidary use of found footage this side of The Atomic Café."
- Orange County Register: "Anyone who values unfettered access to online information is apt to be captivated by Killswitch, a gripping and fast-paced documentary."

Kathy Gill of GeekWire writes that "Killswitch is much more than a dry recitation of technical history. Director Ali Akbarzadeh, producer Jeff Horn, and writer Christopher Dollar created a human centered story. A large part of that connection comes from Lessig and his relationship with Swartz."

== Film festival premieres ==
- International Documentary Film Festival Amsterdam
- Woodstock Film Festival
- Cinequest Film Festival
- Gothenburg Film Festival
- ZagrebDox
- Newport Beach Film Festival

== See also ==
- Internet governance
- Internet kill switch
