= Triple Triad =

Final Fantasy minigame

The game board of Triple Triad as depicted in Final Fantasy VIII. Six cards have already been placed, with three remaining.

Triple Triad is a digital collectible card game and minigame first included in the 1999 Square-developed role-playing video game Final Fantasy VIII. The game revolves around collecting and battling cards with images of different in-game monsters and characters. Many NPCs within the game world can be challenged to a match, which plays out in a diegetic, in-universe manner. Triple Triad was seen by many critics and fans as equally as enjoyable as the game itself, if not more so, gaining a large cult following. It was made into a homebrew PlayStation Portable massively multiplayer online game by fans in 2007, an unofficial browser game, and was later included as a minigame in the MMORPG Final Fantasy XIV, where it became a "phenomenon", with regular tournaments being held at an in-game amusement park, the Manderville Gold Saucer. In 2015, an official freemium Triple Triad mobile game was released by Square Enix as part of the Final Fantasy Portal. It is sometimes played in real life using fan-made physical decks. Future games in the Final Fantasy franchise introduced similar minigames, such as Queen's Blood in Final Fantasy VII Rebirth.

== Gameplay ==
The player begins by choosing five cards from their collection, then places them down, one per turn, on a nine-space grid. In each card's upper left are a grid of four separate numbers, corresponding to the card's power on each of its four sides. Some of the spaces are marked with elements; placing cards on a matching element gives a card a +1 bonus to all stats, while a differing element gives the card a −1 penalty. The next player places a card of their own, attempting to capture the opponent's card by matching or exceeding their stat on that particular side. If the stats are perfectly matched, the captured card will also capture any relevant adjacent cards.

Captured cards can be retaken, with the game ending after the board is full. The player who has flipped the most cards is declared the winner, and gains one or more of the opponent's cards. The rules change depending on the game, including hiding enemy cards, disabling the elements, or forcing the player to choose five random cards.

Triple Triad is integrated into the world and gameplay of Final Fantasy VIII. The card game is diegetically played by the world's characters, and many NPCs can be challenged to a match. Quezacotl, a summoned creature known as a GF (Guardian Force), can learn the ability Card Mod, allowing the player to refine unwanted cards into items, including rare treasures, that can assist them in the wider game. This makes the minigame relevant to the characters' progression as a whole, causing it to be an integral part of the entire story.

In Final Fantasy XIV, regular Triple Triad tournaments are held at the in-game amusement park known as the Manderville Gold Saucer.

== Development ==
In a retrospective interview, Yoshinori Kitase, director of the original Final Fantasy VIII, said that Triple Triad was inspired by Magic: The Gathering, which had been popular at the time. He believed that adding a game played as a pastime by many characters in the world would make it feel more developed. He also sought to add realistic elements from physical collectible card games, like trading with friends and regional rule changes. Takayoshi Nakazato was the minigame's designer, and was contacted on short notice, having already been in charge of the game's battle system. Naoki Yoshida stated that the Final Fantasy XIV incarnation of Triple Triad, along with the Gold Saucer amusement park, was added in order to draw new, more casual players to the game, maintaining a large playerbase.

== Reception ==
A writer for GameFan magazine wrote that he liked Triple Triad more than "most 32-bit puzzle games on console", including Tetris, saying that he had spent so many hours playing Triple Triad that he had forgotten to play the rest of the game. Samuel Roberts of PC Gamer, in a retrospective, wrote that the minigame's music was "ludicrously catchy", and that Triple Triad enhanced the player's experience in a similar way as Gwent from The Witcher 3. Noting that the game got "pretty tactical", he said that he enjoyed the fact that people could share the enjoyment of a card game in an otherwise war-torn world. Calling it "my perfect minigame", he said that it was as satisfying as a real-life trading card game would be. Andy Kelly of TheGamer wrote that it was the greatest minigame of all time, saying that they "don't get much better", and describing its music as a "ridiculous earworm". Saying that "there are so many layers to Triple Triad that calling it a minigame feels almost insulting", describing the Nintendo Switch as the perfect console for it. Andrea Shearon of the same publication described the minigame's FFXIV version as so addictive she stopped playing the game, saying she was "way too deep" into it.

Tiago Manuel of Destructoid described Triple Triad as the best minigame in Final Fantasy history, summing it up as "the perfect companion to the quest at hand" and describing it as "the gold standard". Joshua Rivera of Kotaku called the minigame "incredibly rewarding to play" due to its seamless integration into the game's world. Saying that he never got into any physical card games during his youth, he stated that Triple Triad showed him how fun they could be, ultimately causing his later love for card games "of all stripes". Matt Jarvis of Rock Paper Shotgun remarked that the lack of official Triple Triad physical decks was a "baffling exception to Square Enix squeezing every drop of merch money from its flagship series", prompting fans to create their own fan-made decks, commonly sold on marketplaces like Etsy, and use them to play instead. He wrote that fans regularly brought cards to conventions to play and trade.

== Legacy ==
In 1999, the only official physical version of Triple Triad was released as part of Final Fantasy VIII Carddass Masters Perfect Visuals by Bandai, which contained 72 artwork cards and 110 Triple Triad cards, as well as a game mat. In 2007, an unofficial homebrew standalone version, Triple Triad PSP, was released by a group of Italian developers who were fans of the game, complete with newly-added cards that included creatures from the series up to Final Fantasy X, servers that enabled online play, and a marketplace featuring live chat in which players could buy, sell or trade their cards. An unofficial browser-based version called Triple Triad Advance was also active for more than two decades. A freemium version of the game was released by Square Enix in 2015 within the Final Fantasy Portal app. It only allowed a limited number of plays before the player had to wait to replenish energy or pay for more. In August 2024, Square Enix announced they would be removing Triple Triad from the app at the end of November 2024, adding that quality concerns were the reason for the removal.

Future Final Fantasy games included similar minigames, such as Tetra Master in Final Fantasy IX, which later was included in the MMORPG Final Fantasy XI. In Final Fantasy VII Rebirth, the card-based Queen's Blood minigame incorporated similar mechanics as Triple Triad.
