= Queen's Blood =

Final Fantasy minigame

Queen's Blood is a minigame that appears in the 2024 action role-playing video game Final Fantasy VII Rebirth and is planned to appear in its 2027 sequel Final Fantasy VII Revelation. A fictional collectible card game played by denizens of the game's world, Queen's Blood was inspired by similar collectible card-based minigames in previous entries in the series, such as Triple Triad from Final Fantasy VIII and Tetra Master from Final Fantasy IX. During the course of Rebirth, protagonist Cloud Strife collects cards by beating players of the game in turn-based battles on a tabletop game field. The player can then use these cards against subsequent opponents. Queen's Blood received positive reception from critics, who singled it out as one of the best parts of the game and compared it to the popular Gwent minigame from The Witcher 3 and Genius Invokation TCG from Genshin Impact.

== Gameplay ==
The minigame is played on a checkerboard that contains three lanes. Each monster card has a different power value and rank, denoted by a number and the amount of pawns that are depicted in the card's top corners. The rank of the card determines where it can be played on the board, while the power value is added to the score of the lane it is placed in. The player aims to get a higher score than their opponent when all cards have been placed down, resulting in the score of the lane being added to the player's total. Furthermore, some cards have special abilities that can affect the battle.

== Development ==
Naoki Hamaguchi, Rebirth's director, stated in an interview that the game was inspired by Gwent, but also Marvel Snap's game balance and Splatoon with its aspects of seizing territory from the enemy. The game's designers used paper prototypes and a simple Windows app to conceptualize the game - its design took a year before it began being implemented into the main game itself. The development team also enjoyed the minigame heavily, and surprised Hamaguchi with a 3D-printed physical version of the game, including a fully detailed game board, towards the end of development.

He also stated at Otakon that the game's sequel would get a "revamped" version of Queen's Blood. He also noted the high amount of fan requests for a physical version of the card game.

== Reception ==
Heather Wald of GamesRadar+ called the minigame Final Fantasy VII Rebirth's "best new addition", and she said she wished she could play it in real life. Comparing it to Gwent, she stated that "Queen's Blood has sunk its card-shaped claws into me in much the same way", also praising the addition of a tournament. Ed Nightingale of Eurogamer described the game as "as offbeat and eccentric as Final Fantasy has ever been" due to the odd NPCs the player is matched up against, also calling it a "welcome shift" from the main quest's "apocalyptic" tone. He stated that while matches were quick, there was "plenty of room" for tactical play. He called it the best card game of the year over games such as Balatro and Pokémon TCG Pocket.

Oli Welsh of Polygon stated that the minigame possessed "a simple but deeply strategic, almost puzzle-like setup", saying that he could see himself "losing hours to this one". Ken Allsop of PCGamesN called it "one of the finest strapped-on card games in years", even describing it as superior to Gwent, Triple Triad, or Pazaak in Star Wars: Knights of the Old Republic.
