= Star Fox Grand Prix =

Video game hoax

The fake Star Fox Grand Prix logo originally sent to IGN later proven to be fake

Star Fox Grand Prix (Note: Also written as Star Fox: Grand Prix) is a video game hoax about a rumoured new title in Nintendo's Star Fox series. The hoax initially started on Reddit, and later 4Chan, before then being reported on by multiple video game news websites in May 2018. According to the rumours, the game was purported to be a spin-off racing video game developed by American studio Retro Studios for the Nintendo Switch.

Following an investigation conducted by gaming blog and YouTube channel Did You Know Gaming? into the rumours in 2023, they determined the existence of the game to be a hoax from interviews conducted with employees from Retro Studios, with the hoax having originated from a YouTube content creator using photo editing software after being inspired by the film Grand Prix.

== History ==
=== Background ===
Star Fox is a rail shooter and space flight simulator video game series created by game designer Shigeru Miyamoto and developed and published by Nintendo. Starting in 1993 with the original Star Fox on the Super Nintendo Entertainment System (SNES), the series follows the Star Fox team led by protagonist Fox McCloud, who pilot futuristic fighter spacecraft called Arwings during missions around the Lylat planetary system. The series has since gone on to have new instalments on newer Nintendo platforms such as the Nintendo 64, GameCube, and Nintendo DS, with the most recent title in the series being Star Fox Zero for the Wii U in 2016.

Racing has been previously tied to the franchise through in-universe lore as well as cameos in other series, with the Nintendo DS game Star Fox Command introducing the "G-Zero Grand Prix" in one of its endings, where characters Fox and Falco convert the Arwings into racing machines. A character based on James McCloud, Fox's father, first appeared in F-Zero X, where he pilots a racing machine resembling an Arwing; similarly, the F-Zero character Octoman would go on to cameo in Command.

=== Leak ===
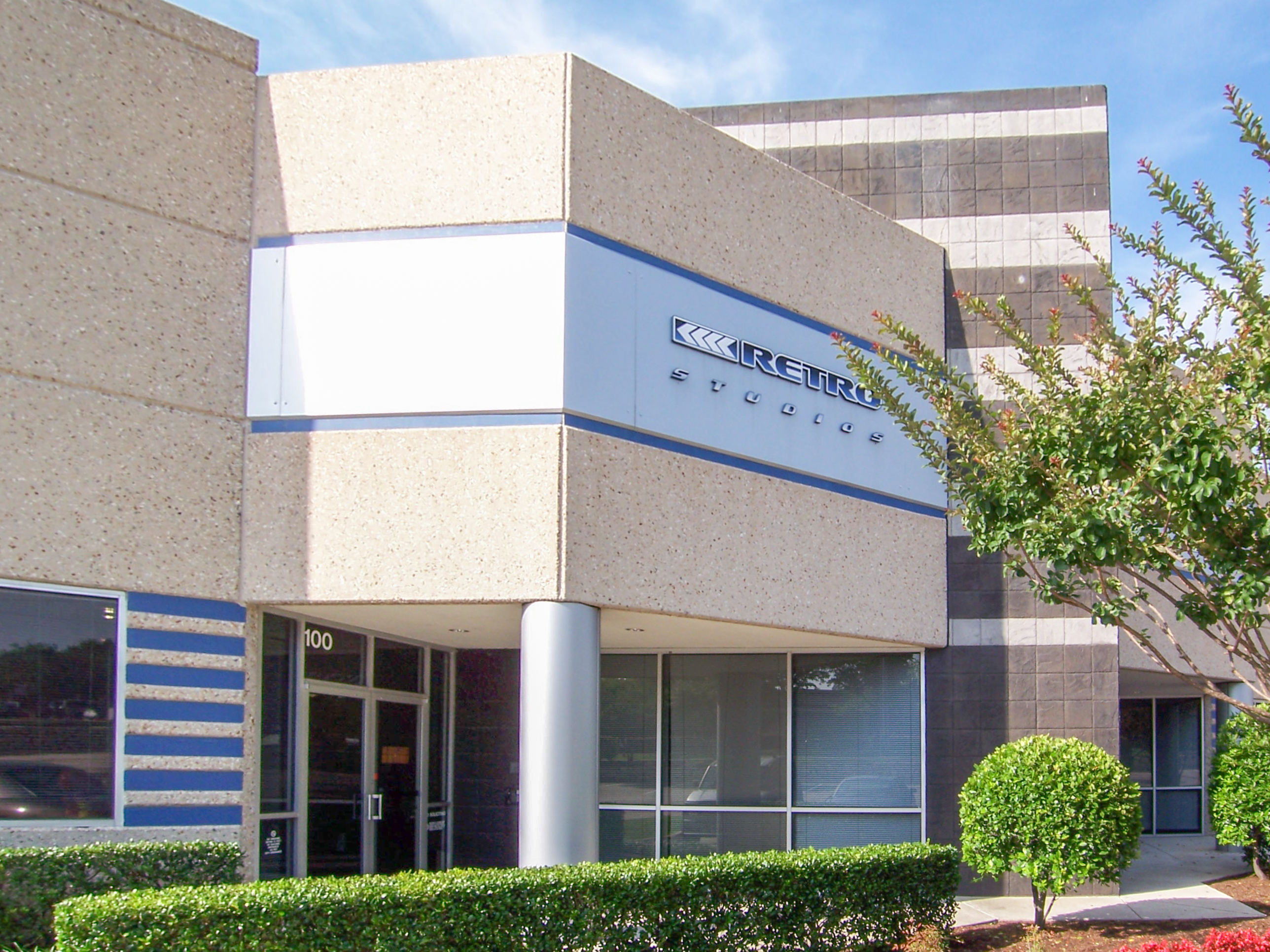
Retro Studios' former headquarters in 2011

In early May 2018, a user on social media website Reddit with the username DasVergeben posted a rumour on the subreddit r/StarFox claiming to have insider information about a new title in the Star Fox franchise. According to the post, the title would be a spinoff to the mainline games and was being developed by American studio Retro Studios, who previously had not worked with the IP, under the name Star Fox Grand Prix. The game would fall into the racing genre, with DasVergeben comparing the gameplay as a mix of other similar Nintendo racing games such as Diddy Kong Racing and F-Zero, though added it would align more with the latter. DasVergeben would further mention Grand Prix featuring an Adventure mode that would host boss battles and a hub world; the mode was also compared to by the user to Diddy Kong Racing. Around the same time, a different user on the website 4chan would try to corroborate the rumour by posting an image of the game's logo.

On 14 May 2018, the rumour was noticed and reported on by the website Nintendo Insider, followed by other video game news websites such as Eurogamer, Game Informer, and Nintendo Life. Writing for Kotaku, journalist Jason Schreier admitted that similar rumours related to the subject had been "floating around gossipy Nintendo fan and writer circles" for multiple weeks prior but waited to acknowledge anything about it until it had become public. Journalists Imran Khan and Tom Phillips claimed they had heard about the rumours month prior, though Phillips noted he hadn't heard of the game's name and neither could fully verify the accuracy of the sources. In a report for IGN, Evan Campbell claimed the publication had received a logo for the game as well as additional information on top of similar rumours that other journalists reported on. He detailed that the game's core concept would be a combination of "timed races and shooting" where players could defeat enemies to gain a speed boost to improve lap times; Grand Prix's core gameplay structure would revolve around three races followed by a boss fight and mentioned that the game would also have an online mode for players to compete against each other. Campbell similarly clarified that he was unable to corroborate the information and that the source of the information was unknown, adding that he was not able to receive confirmation for the information from a "development source".

Similarly, industry insider Emily Rogers claimed she had also heard about the rumours as far back as February of that year, though added that they were not reported on at the time as they were perceived to be "too bizarre to be true." She would make additional comments on ResetEra related to the project of either a specific genre or Nintendo franchise in order to enjoy the game. Video game historian and journalist Liam Robertson told Nintendo Life of additional information regarding Grand Prix. Alongside the existing information reported by IGN, Robertson was informed that gameplay was more akin to NGEN Racing for the original PlayStation rather than F-Zero and would feature "classic Star Fox moments" such as shooting enemies and other players. Robertson expanded on the function of the hub, describing it as a place for entering races and story elements, as well as for players to walk around and interact with characters from the Star Fox franchise. Other information relayed to Nintendo Life was the inclusion of characters from other franchises such as Donkey Kong, Grand Prix may not be the final name for the game, and that the game could release as early as 2018 or 2019, though Robertson would later update his report to say the latter comment was accurate.

== Reception ==
Following the reporting, some users on Reddit called into question the legitimacy of the logo and questioned whether the title was just "a big joke gone a bit too far" made by leakers and journalists. However, other online users and journalists were more hopeful that the rumours were true and that the game would be announced at the upcoming E3 2018 trade show, with IGN's Marty Sliva describing the game as one of the "big [gaming] rumors" at the time, though Sliva personally believed that whilst the game was real, it wouldn't be revealed at Nintendo's showcase. However, following the lack of an announcement for Grand Prix in Nintendo's E3 Direct presentation, many began to question the title's disappearance, with Emily Rogers even claiming to be unsure on the status of the title, especially following the announcement that Retro Studios would be starting their development of Metroid Prime 4 in January 2019. In February 2019, a user on ResetEra theorised that insiders had mistaken the game for Starlink: Battle for Atlas, as during E3 2018 it was announced the Nintendo Switch version of the game featured a crossover with the Star Fox series that had a playable Fox McCloud piloting his Arwing, and later gameplay showcased races with starships, including the Arwing. However, Nintendo Life's Gavin Lane refuted the theory, believing that the "mental gymnastics needed to explain away Retro's involvement don't stand up to scrutiny" and that the idea a game developed by Retro would be recycled into an Ubisoft game was "absurd".

Regardless of the credibility of the rumours, journalists still responded positively to the concepts of Star Fox Grand Prix. John Rairdin from Nintendo World Report praised the concept and believed the Diddy Kong Racing gameplay would blend well with the Star Fox series, believing that its universe was perfect for a racing game and that the latter's on-rails and vehicle transformation gameplay was similar to the former's. Rairdin defended the game being a spin-off by arguing that those sorts of titles have been responsible for great games in the industry, using Retro Studios' Metroid Prime as an example. He further argued that Grand Prix could also solve problems critics have had with the series and genre, such as a return of a hub world in a racing game and the introduction of true multi-player to the Star Fox series. Writing for Pocket Gamer, Jon Mundy used the idea as a base to suggest other Nintendo franchises try to combine genres and other gaming franchises for new games, such as a Metroid Prime game in the style of Destiny or a Kid Icarus game in the form of a Metroidvania. Damien McFerran of Nintendo Life speculated the game could canonise the "Curse of Pigma" ending from Star Fox Command (the ending where Fox converts his Arwing into a racing machine), as McFerran explains that since Command was the last game chronologically, it is unknown which ending in the game is officially the canon one. Pierre-Alexandre Rouillon from Gamekult hoped that should Grand Prix become a success, it could lead to a new HD F-Zero title down the line.

== Investigation ==
Over the following years, Star Fox Grand Prix would not appear among any of Nintendo's presentations, leading many online to question the rumours' legitimacy. On 17 June 2023, five years after the initial reports, YouTube channel Did You Know Gaming? (DYKG) released a video documenting their two year investigation into the origins of the rumours and to if the title was real or a hoax. In their investigation, the channel interviewed both former and current Retro Studios staff as well as journalists and online content creators who initially reported on the rumours, and investigated whether the title was a fake leak created by Nintendo to uncover leakers or if insiders had mistaken Starlink for Grand Prix.

During their investigation, Did You Know Gaming? uncovered that the name and the logo for the game was created by online content creator RogersBase; he stated that the name stemmed from the 1966 film Grand Prix, as it was his dad's favourite film and it had popped into his head, whereas the logo was the result of a quick photoshop of the Star Fox Guard logo, which he originally intended to use in a thumbnail for an unreleased video covering a rumour from 2012 about Retro Studios developing a crossover game between the Star Fox and Metroid franchises. (Note: According to a former Retro senior producer, the crossover game was fake.) Despite creating the initial idea, RogersBase denied being responsible for the leak. Instead, DYKG reported that RogersBase had showed a handful of friends the logo with one of them, an anonymous rumourmonger on Twitter, had taken the logo and sent it to IGN; DYKG, however, could not determine a clear motive for the rumourmonger as they had heard conflicting reasons for why they did it. A second logo, seemingly a variant of the made by RogersBase, was given to IGN from a user on 4chan, although DYKG couldn't identify its origin. In trying to investigate the leaker DasVergeben about their information, they avoided commenting. DYKG speculated that they likely piggybacking information from a circle of journalists who were sending each other the logos in group chats weeks prior to their reporting.

Another origin for the rumours stemmed from a senior journalist who had being given a sneak peek by Ubisoft to see gameplay of Starlink: Battle for Atlas. According to separate unnamed journalists, the individual allegedly reported to other journalists that they had seen a Star Fox racing game developed by Retro rather than Starlink; in an interview with DYKG, the senior journalist explained they only ever mentioned seeing Starlink and denied ever claiming he had seen Grand Prix. In their conclusion, DYKG believed that Grand Prix likely stemmed from a group of journalists hearing from each other about the game and thinking there were multiple sources, when in actuality the only source was the photoshopped logo.

In response to the video, both Nintendojo's Elexis Angulo and Nintendo Life's Jim Norman commended the investigation, with Angulo stating that Did You Know Gaming? "did their due diligence" in uncovering the five year long mystery, although lamented that this meant Star Fox racing game was not going to be announced any time soon.

== See also ==
- Polybius (urban legend)
- List of spurious works of fiction – Fictional works not confirmed to exist
- Sheng Long
