= Kill switch =

Safety mechanism to quickly shut down a system

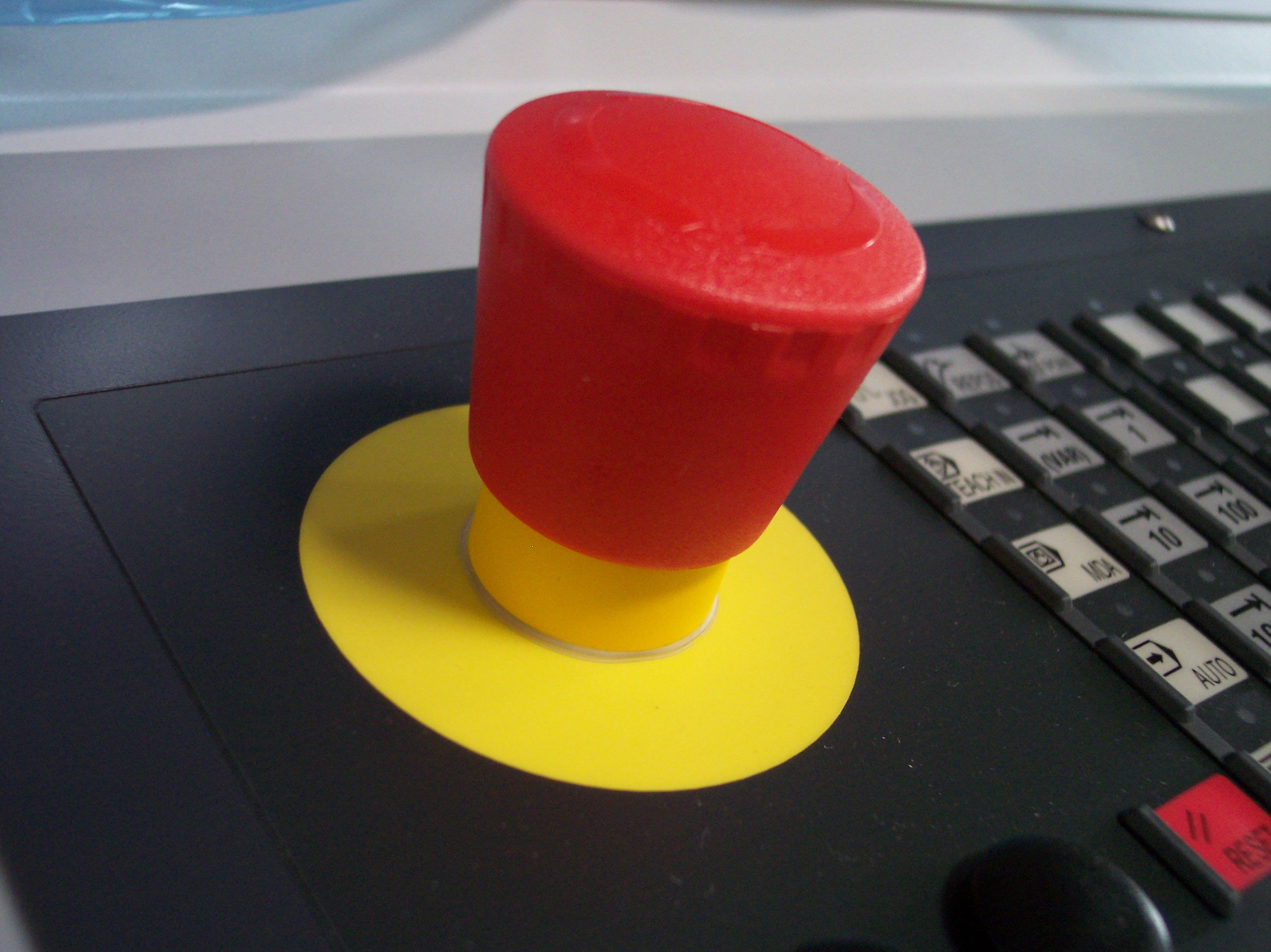
- A kill switch without a cover
- Classification: Mechanical component
- Industry: Automotive, boating, energy, engineering, entertainment
- Powered: Varies, some mechanical

A kill switch, also known more formally as an emergency brake, emergency stop (E-stop), emergency off (EMO), or emergency power off (EPO), is a safety mechanism used to shut off machinery in an emergency, when it cannot be shut down in the usual manner. Unlike a normal shut-down switch or shut-down procedure, which shuts down all systems in order and turns off the machine without damage, a kill switch is designed and configured to abort the operation as quickly as possible (even if it damages the equipment) and to be operated simply and quickly (so that even a panicked operator with impaired executive functions or a bystander can activate it). Kill switches are usually designed to be noticeable, even to an untrained operator or a bystander.

Some kill switches feature a removable, protective barrier against accidental activation, such as a plastic cover that must be lifted or glass that must be broken, known as a molly-guard. Kill switches are features of mechanisms whose normal operation or foreseeable misuse might cause injury or death; industrial designers include kill switches because damage to or the destruction of the machinery is less important than preventing workplace injuries and deaths.

A similar system, usually called a dead man's switch, is a device intended to stop a machine (or activate one) if the human operator becomes incapacitated or leaves the machine unattended, and is a form of fail-safe. They are commonly used in industrial applications (e.g., locomotives, tower cranes, freight elevators) and consumer applications (e.g., lawn mowers, tractors, personal watercraft, outboard motors, snow blowers, motorcycles and snowmobiles). The switch in these cases is held by the user, and turns off the machine if they let go. Some riding lawnmowers have a kill switch in the seat which stops the engine and blade if the operator's weight is no longer on the seat.

== Vehicles ==
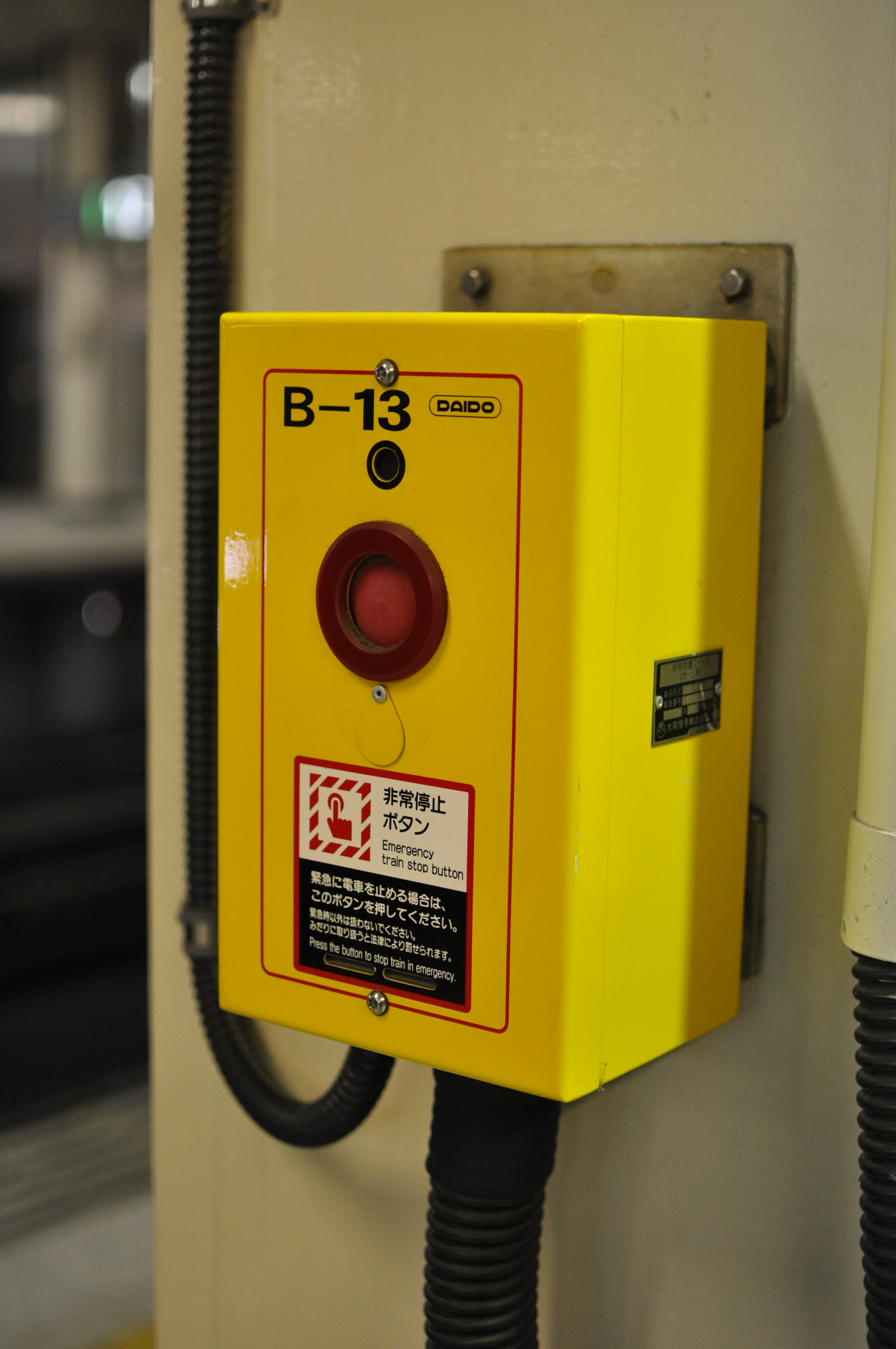
An emergency switch in Japan

On railways, an emergency stop is a full application of the brakes in order to bring a train to a stop as quickly as possible. This occurs either by a manual emergency stop activation, such as a button being pushed on the train to start the emergency stop, or on some trains automatically, when the train has passed a red signal or the driver has failed to respond to warnings to check that they are still alert, which is known as a dead man's switch. A similar mechanism is the watchdog timer.

In large ships, an emergency stop button pulls the countershaft for the fuel pumps to the stop position, cutting off the fuel supply and stopping the engines. With a controllable-pitch propeller, the stop button may declutch the engine from the propeller.

NASCAR requires all their stock cars to be equipped with a steering wheel–mounted kill switch, in case the accelerator pedal sticks and the driver needs to shut down the engine.

A related concept is the dead man's switch, where the operator must be holding a button or lever any time the vehicle is operating. A common example of this is the kill switches used by boaters and jetskiers wherein a cord connects the kill switch to the operator (usually by the operator's life jacket or clothing), and if the operator is thrown overboard in an accident, the cord will pull the switch and immediately shut down the vessel's engine. This prevents it from becoming a runaway vessel that could impose a danger to other vessels or swimmers at sea, and allows the operator to swim back to the vessel and re-board it without the risk of being injured by the boat's propeller. A similar device is featured on most lawnmowers: a lever on the handle either disables the ignition system and applies a brake to the flywheel (on a gasoline lawnmower), or cuts the power to the motor (on an electric lawnmower), as long as it is not held down.

Monster Truck Racing Association requires all of their monster trucks to be equipped with kill switches (either remote or in cab), in case the monster truck loses control and the driver needs to shut off the engine. Monster trucks' kill switches are tested before races.

=== Pioneer-era planes and World War I aircraft ===
Early aviators using rotary engine–powered aircraft from the beginnings of their use in 1908, up through the end of World War I in 1918 had what could be called a reversed functionality version of the "dead man's switch" for cutting the ignition voltage to the spark plugs on such a power-plant, to give a degree of in-flight speed control for a rotary engine. This was often called a "blip switch" or "coupe switch" (from the French term coupez, or "cut") and when not being pressed, allowed the high voltage from the engine's magnetos to operate the ignition with normal engine operation in flight—pressing the "blip switch" cut the flow of high voltage from the magnetos, stopping the combustion process in the cylinders. When such a "blip switch" was intermittently used on landing approach, this allowed a limited degree of engine speed control, as rotary engines generally did not have a conventional throttle in their carburettors to regulate engine speed, but only for governing the fuel-air ratio for start-up and full-speed operation.

== Anti-theft ==
Kill switches are also used on land vehicles as an anti-theft system and as an emergency power off. Such devices are often placed in bait cars and configured so that observing police can trigger the switch remotely. This same idea can make the stolen object, such as a smartphone, useless to both the thief and whoever buys it, yet allow the true owner to reactivate it when/if it is recovered.

=== Smartphones ===
In smartphones, a kill switch is a security feature that allows the phone's owner to remotely render the smartphone inoperable if it is lost or stolen. From 2015 this feature is legally required in California for smartphones. There are also hardware kill switches on some phones, such as PinePhone, where the user can, by moving a hardware switch inside the phone, disable hardware like the camera, microphone, Wi-Fi or LTE.

=== Software ===
By analogy to physical kill switches, kill switch can be used to refer to a mechanism incorporated in software that can be activated by its manufacturer or licensor, for example if the product is withdrawn, or a maintenance fee has not been paid, or a device has been lost or stolen. It can also refer to kill switches for the stopping of malware such as in the WannaCry ransomware attack.

There is a debate about implementing kill switches in robots and advanced artificial intelligence systems.

==== In AI ====
Google started to work on a hardware kill switch for AI in 2016.

== Industrial machinery ==
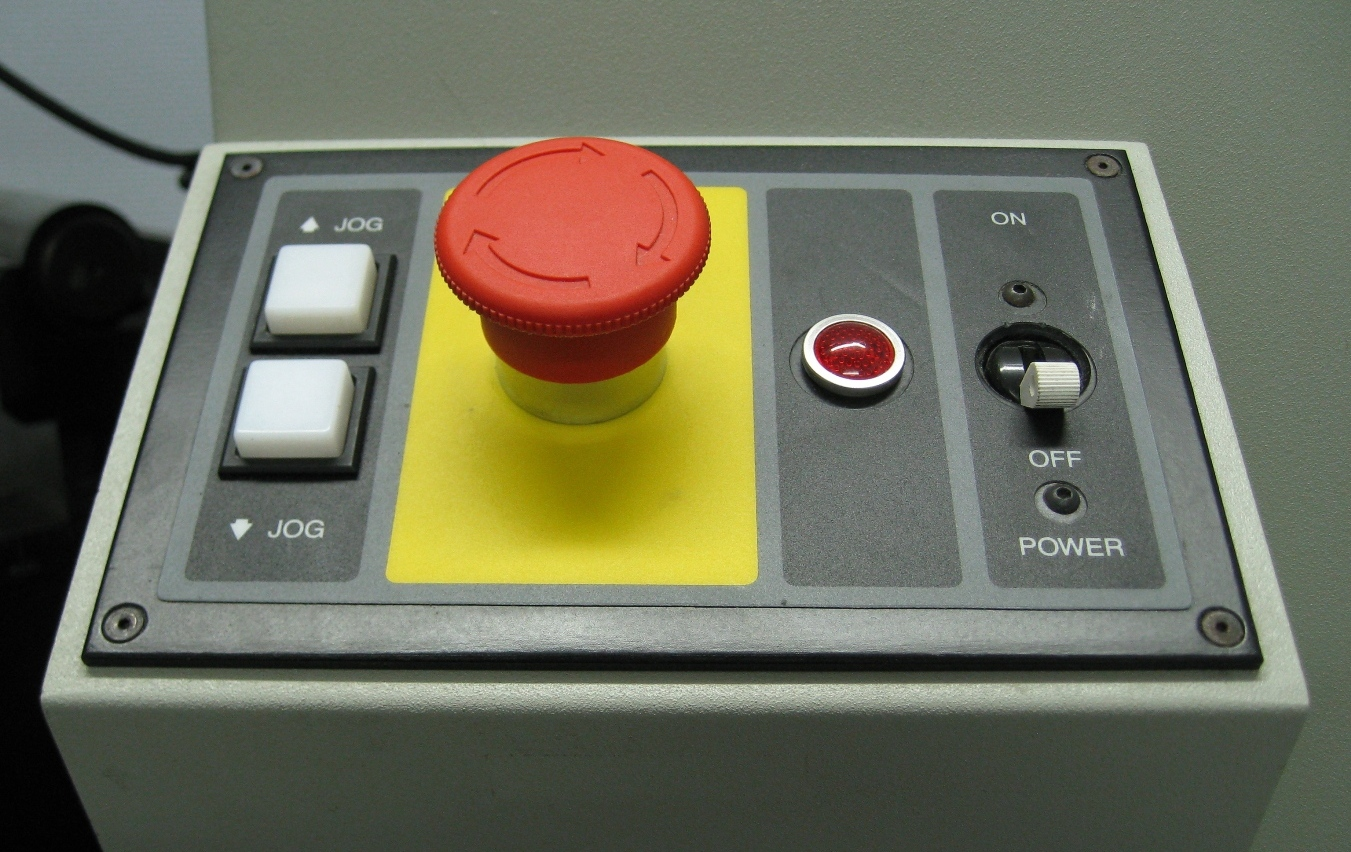
The arrows indicate that the stop button must be turned to reset the switch before the equipment can be restarted.

On large industrial machines, an emergency stop button is typically located on the panel, and possibly in several other areas of the machine. Often, an emergency stop is made wireless using a remote control. This provides a rapid means to disconnect the energy source of the device to protect workers. For fail-safe operation, the emergency stop button is a normally closed switch, which ensures that a broken wire will not prevent it from being activated, but may accidentally activate the emergency stop.

In the European Union, most types of machinery are required to be equipped with an emergency stop according to Annex I, section 1.2.4.3 of the Directive 2006/42/EC. Exceptions apply for machinery in which an emergency stop would not lessen the risk as well as for portable hand-held/hand-guided machinery. Regulation (EU) 2023/1230 on machinery, which applies from January 20, 2027 in place of the Directive, keeps the same requirement and exceptions in Annex III, section 1.2.4.3.

=== Nuclear power plants ===
A kill switch in a nuclear reactor plant is called SCRAM. It is usually characterized as an acronym for "safety control rod ax man", though this is probably a backronym.

=== Early computers ===
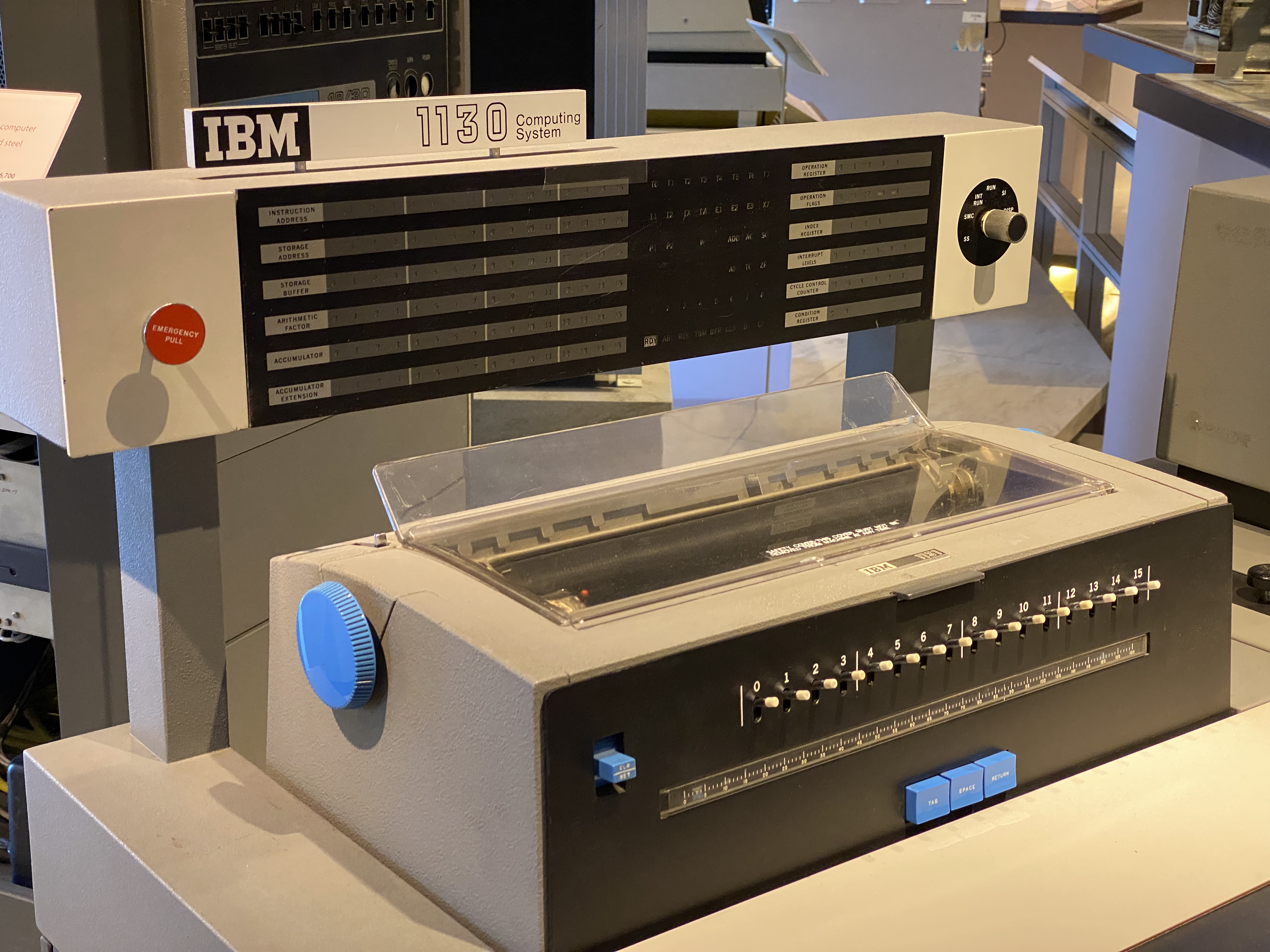
Emergency off switch, left, on an IBM 1130 computer console

Early computers were large electrical devices and typically had an emergency off switch located on or near the operator's console.

== Machine tools ==
Emergency stop functions are frequently used on machine tools, including equipment like wood and metal sawing machines, grinding machines, drilling machines, milling machines and machining centres and lathes. The emergency stop safety function, and general requirements for emergency stop devices are set out in ISO 13850. Machine specific (type-C) standards often include specific requirements for the emergency stop functions, but in the absence of a relevant type-C standard, the risk assessment should be used to determine whether or not an emergency stop function would be useful in avoiding or limiting harm. The ISO machinery safety standard types are defined in ISO 12100, and this nomenclature is used by other standards development organizations, like ANSI in the US, and CSA in Canada.

=== Complementary protective measure ===
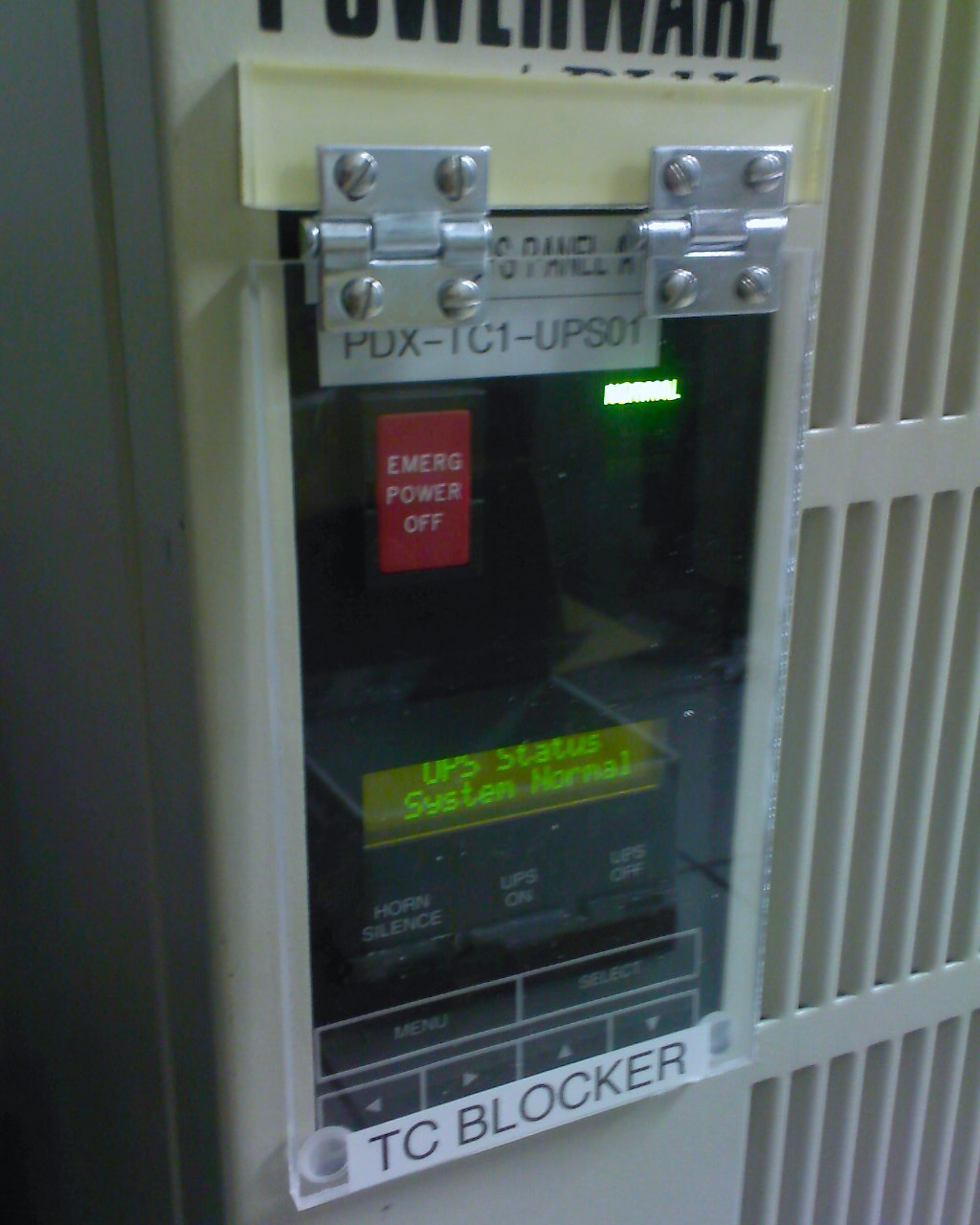
An emergency stop button with a custom-made plastic molly guard to prevent it from being pressed accidentally

A machinery's emergency stop control is considered a complementary protective measure because it is intended to complement the primary safeguarding measures like fixed guards, movable interlocked guards or safeguarding devices. The primary safeguarding measures prevent injury automatically, either by enforcing distance between a hazard and a person, or by eliminating the hazard by stopping hazardous motion or switching off a source of hazardous energy.

By contrast, an emergency stop requires a deliberate action on the part of a person who must first recognize that some hazardous condition is about to arise or is arising, and who then must activate the emergency stop function by pressing the emergency stop button or activating another emergency stop device such as a pull-cord switch.

== Fuel stations and road vehicles ==
A kill switch is also used for gasoline pumps or any other device that pumps large amounts of explosive or flammable chemicals. There is commonly a single kill switch for all pumps at a pumping station.

== Elevators and escalators ==
Elevators often have a red two-way button on the control panel which is either marked "Emergency Stop" or "Run/Stop". Normally, the button is in the "up" or unpushed position, allowing the elevator to "run" in normal service. When the button is pushed, the elevator comes to an immediate stop. When the button is pulled back out, it resumes normal service, thus the reason for the use of the phrase "Run/Stop". Escalators will typically have a key-operated control that will turn the escalator off, or change its direction to up or down. Next to the key switch will be a red "Emergency Stop" button, which is used in the event of equipment failure, or where there is a potential for injury, such as when someone's shoe gets stuck in the "comb" at the top or bottom of the escalator and there is a risk of serious injury. The key switch is used to return the escalator to service after it has been stopped.

== Exercise machines ==
Treadmills often use a safety key with one end magnetically attached to the machine and the other end clipped to the user's waist. If the safety key is pulled out, such as in the event of a fall, the treadmill stops immediately. In other cases, some other treadmills have a more traditional kill switch, often mounted towards the rear of one of the hand railings.

== Amusement rides ==
The emergency stop on an amusement ride is similar to that on industrial equipment. Typically brakes on a ride are designed to be disengaged when power is applied; disconnecting power will cause all brakes to engage. Most amusement rides have a computer that can, similar to the rail example provided above, engage the emergency stop when such a ride is determined to be out of operating specification, or an accident involving a passenger or ride employee has happened.

== Spaceflight ==
Range safety systems can automatically destroy errant vehicles in-flight. Range-safety officers may also manually destroy vehicles; this method was used to destroy errant solid rocket boosters in the Space Shuttle Challenger disaster.

== See also ==
- Battleshort – Emergency override of safety features to complete a mission, even if damage or injury will occur; the opposite of a kill switch
- Blue light station – Emergency telephone and shut-off switch
- Emergency brake (train) – Device to stop a train quickly
- Internet kill switch – Single shut off mechanism for all Internet traffic
