= Polybius (urban legend) =

Fictitious 1981 arcade game

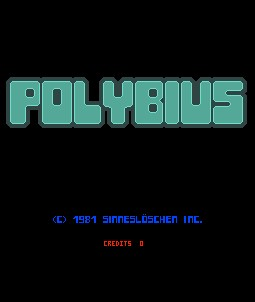
An alleged start screen, attached to an article on coinop.org

Polybius is an urban legend about a mysterious arcade video game. According to the legend, the game appeared in arcades around Portland, Oregon in 1981. The gameplay was supposedly psychoactive, abstract, and dangerous. Children who played the arcade game were said to suffer from amnesia, seizures, night terrors, and hallucinations. Despite these adverse effects, the arcade cabinet was described as so addictive that players returned to Polybius repeatedly until they went insane, died, or vanished. The lack of any surviving Polybius cabinets is explained by men in black who were said to record data on the players before removing all the arcade machines.

There is no evidence for any Polybius machines in the 1980s. The earliest known print reference is the September 2003 issue of GamePro. The earliest online reference to Polybius is a coinop.org page, dated to 1998. There is no record of the supposed publisher, Sinneslöschen, and no surviving arcade cabinet has surfaced. People claiming to have seen a Polybius arcade machine may be conflating it with memories of unusual actual titles from the period, such as Cube Quest and Tempest.

Journalists and scholars have linked the urban legend to cultural anxieties from the period and real but unrelated events. In 1981, two Portland residents became ill while playing games at the same arcade. Ten days later, the Federal Bureau of Investigation raided multiple Portland arcades for illegally converting arcade games into gambling machines. Parents publicly expressed concerns that the new video game arcades could be dangerous. There were reported cases of epileptic seizures, and one teenager died while playing Berzerk, which led to rumors of a cursed arcade game. Urban legends spread of arcade cabinets built to hypnotize players. These rumors influenced science fiction, including Robert Maxxe's novel Arcade. Additionally, Atari covertly tested unfinished games in real arcades to monitor player reactions.

The urban legend has had a lasting cultural impact. It has persisted in video game journalism and appeared in music, television, film, and performance art. Two video games titled Polybius were released in 2007 and 2017, claiming a connection to the purported arcade game. In fiction, the game and legend have been used to evoke 1980s nostalgia, supernatural themes, and conspiracy theories.

== Background ==
There is no evidence that the game ever existed. It is considered to be an urban legend or a deliberate hoax. Fact-checking website Snopes calls the game a modern-day version of 1980s rumors about "men in black" recording the high-score initials from arcade machines. No newspapers or gaming magazines from the 1980s mention Polybius, and no ROM image of the arcade machine's software has ever surfaced. Aside from mockup cabinets and games inspired by the myth, no Polybius cabinets have ever been found.

The first online mention of Polybius is a coinop.org article dated to 1998. It includes a purported screenshot of the title screen allegedly from a ROM image file created from an original arcade machine. On May 16, 2009, an update to the page promised to bring further information after a trip to Kyiv, Ukraine, to investigate. As of 2026, no further information has been added to the page. Researchers have found evidence that the entry was first uploaded a few years after 1998, indicating that even the upload date was fabricated. Archives of the entry from 2000 do not contain the 1998 date, but do contain the text:

Last Modification of this game: 2/6/2000 10:23:41 AM
Reason for modification: New addition - anyone heard of this game?

The earliest known printed mention of Polybius is in the September 2003 issue of GamePro. The feature story "Secrets and Lies" declared the game's existence to be "inconclusive". The article spread the legend to a broader audience, but its author only heard about the legend when the owner of coinop.org contacted him. Interest was further kindled in 2006 when a post appeared on the coinop.org forums by an individual presenting himself as "Steven Roach" and claiming to have founded Sinneslöschen. Based on the timeline of publications, the gaming magazine Inverse concluded that the game "was almost certainly invented" to promote coinop.org.

There is no record of the game's purported publisher, Sinneslöschen. Author Brian Dunning describes the word as "not-quite-idiomatic German" meaning "sense delete" or "sensory deprivation". Sinnlöschen would be a more standard German construction.

Polybius shares its name with the classical Greek historian Polybius, who was born in Arcadia. He was known for his assertion that historians should never report what they cannot verify through interviews with eyewitnesses. He was also known for his work on puzzles and cryptography, such as the Polybius square.

== Legend ==
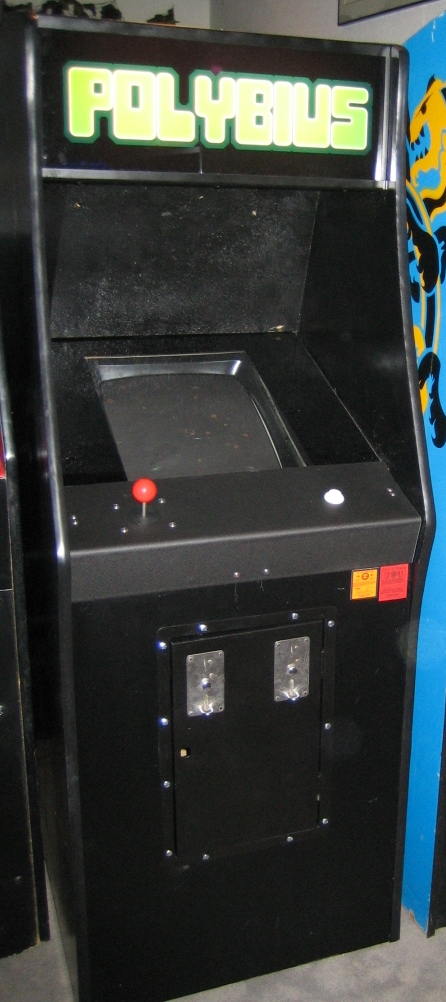
A mock-up Polybius cabinet made by Rogue Synapse

According to the legend, a new video game appeared in suburban arcades around Portland, Oregon, in 1981. Released during the golden age of arcade video games, it was housed in a simple black cabinet. The game was abstract and geometric but highly addictive. People who claim to remember playing the game recall different and contradictory gameplay experiences. Players supposedly suffered from seizures, amnesia, insomnia, night terrors, and hallucinations. Addicted to the new game, children formed lines around the cabinet and fought each other for access to the machine. They continued to play, becoming increasingly unwell, until after just a few weeks all of the Polybius machines were taken away.

It is claimed that the machines were visited by men in black, who collected some form of unknown data but left the coins inside. It was said that the game could turn itself on autonomously. Polybius was suspected to be not a product but an experiment to test responses to the game's psychoactive stimuli. Some accounts connected Polybius to the CIA's real-world mind control program, MKUltra. At the legend's end, some of the players went insane, some took their own lives, and the arcade machines vanished without a trace.

== Themes ==
The story of Polybius may be rooted in several real but unrelated events. Author Brian Dunning believes the Polybius legend grew out of a mixture of 1980s influences. For example, two players fell ill in a Portland arcade on the same day in 1981. Teenage Portland resident Michael Lopez developed a migraine headache after playing Tempest and left the arcade. He was found unconscious in a stranger's yard after blacking out. During a filmed attempt to break the Asteroids world record at the same arcade where Lopez became ill, another Portland teen played for 28 hours until suffering from stomach pain. Ten days later, the Federal Bureau of Investigation (FBI) raided several Portland arcades in the area. The lead-up to the raid involved FBI agents monitoring arcade cabinets for evidence of tampering and recording high scores for possible witnesses. The FBI made 52 Portland arcade arrests in 1981, and 25 arrests at a single arcade north of Portland a year later. Some arcade owners had illegally converted video game cabinets into gambling machines.

Many adults in the 1980s expressed concern about the new video games children spent so much time on. Early video games were the subject of fears and anxieties about their possible dangers. A 1980 New York Times article commented on their potential for addiction, and the National Safety Council claimed that video games promoted violence. There are nine recorded cases of arcade games triggering epileptic seizures in the 1980s. In 1982, a teenager died while playing Berzerk in Calumet City, Illinois. His heart failure was not triggered by the game but led to rumors of a cursed arcade game.

Although contemporary magazines and newspapers do not mention Polybius, similar legends and rumors circulated in the late 1970s and early 1980s, of arcade machines designed to hypnotize, brainwash, or recruit players. The unusual machines and the affected players were then said to disappear. These rumors influenced science fiction such as the film The Last Starfighter, in which a teenage gamer is monitored and recruited by aliens. The novel Arcade by Robert Maxxe was less popular than Starfighter but featured a fictional game very similar to Polybius. The book centered on government mind control experiments done to children in arcades.

Atari's testing procedures for new games may have also contributed to men in black rumors. Atari, then a major arcade game developer, would covertly place small numbers of unfinished new video games into public arcades. Atari's employees swapped in test versions of these unfinished games and observed players' responses in the arcades. To prevent their competitors from rushing copycat games to market, Atari did not disclose the true nature of these field tests to any arcade patrons.

The United States military has modified several video games to train soldiers. In the early 1980s, they commissioned Atari to modify the tank combat game Battlezone into a tank training simulator called The Bradley Trainer. The project and the reluctance of Battlezone programmer Ed Rotberg were covered by newspapers in 1981. In the late 1990s, just before the first Polybius rumors began to spread, the military had Doom II modified into a virtual training program for marines called Marine Doom.

== Memories and influences ==
Players claiming to remember playing or seeing Polybius in the 1980s may be recalling one of several unusual games from the period. Several games may have influenced the legend and have been proposed as the "real Polybius". For example, the arcade game Cube Quest was released in 1983. It used LaserDisc technology to create "hallucinogenic" environments for players to fly through. The advanced LaserDisc visuals resulted in frequent breakdowns and an early removal from arcades. Poly-Play, the only arcade video game developed in East Germany, had a similar name and typeface. University of Arizona professor Judd Ruggill has also proposed Tempest as an influence. Tempest is an abstract and geometric game that requires intense focus and was inspired by the nightmares of its creator.

While some people have claimed to remember earlier mentions on Usenet, no archived Usenet posts discuss Polybius. However, the Publius Enigma, an unsolved puzzle connected to Pink Floyd's 1994 album The Division Bell, was discussed on Usenet in the early 1990s. These early recollections of the game may be false memories, recalling instead the similarly named Publius Enigma.

== Legacy ==
Polybius has inspired and appeared in music, television, and films. It has been used to evoke connections to the supernatural and to the 1980s, including a central cameo as the "main attraction" in the Nine Inch Nails music video "Less Than". It has cameos in many TV series, such as The Goldbergs (2013) and The Simpsons (2006). A cameo appearance of a Polybius cabinet in Loki (2021) gained acclaim on social media as an example of Loki referencing real-world conspiracy theories, and sparked speculation that the game was integral to the show's fictional multiverse. For Paper Girls (2022), CBR reported that the Polybius cameo gave the series 1980s science fiction credentials and differentiated it from Stranger Things (2016). Artists Goto80 and Raquel Meyers also explored the theme in a series of performances in 2010. The Polybius Conspiracy is a seven-part podcast published in 2017, adapted from a canceled feature film project. A novel by Collin Armstrong was published in 2025 through Gallery.

Two major video games were inspired by Polybius and bear its name. In 2007, freeware developers and arcade constructors Rogue Synapse published a free downloadable game titled Polybius for Windows at sinnesloschen.com. Its design is partly based on a description posted on a forum by an individual who claimed to have worked on the original. Rogue Synapse's owner, Dr. Estil Vance, even founded a corporation bearing the name Sinnesloschen. They present it as an "attempt to recreate the Polybius game as it might have existed in 1981". In 2016, Llamasoft announced Polybius for the PlayStation 4 with PlayStation VR support. Developer Jeff Minter initially claimed to have played the original Polybius arcade machine in Basingstoke, England, but later admitted that this claim was itself a contribution to the hoax. Minter's game does not attempt to reproduce Polybius' alleged gameplay, but it is instead closer to his work on Tempest successors Tempest 2000 and TxK.

Ben Silverman of Yahoo! Games remarked, "Unfortunately, there is no evidence that the game ever existed, no less turned its users into babbling lunatics ... Still, Polybius has enjoyed cult-like status as a throwback to a more technologically paranoid era." Ripley's Believe It or Not! called Polybius "the most dangerous video game to never exist". Portland historian Joe Streckert says of the game, "What H.P. Lovecraft's Necronomicon is for books, Polybius is for videogames." Portland Monthly calls it "one of Portland's craziest urban legends" and mentions that people at the time speculated that it might be part of the CIA's MKUltra mind control program of the 1950s–1970s.

== See also ==
- List of urban legends
- List of spurious works of fiction – Fictional works not confirmed to exist
- Satanic panic – Widespread moral panic alleging abuse
- Toynbee tiles – Messages of unknown origin found embedded in asphalt of streets
- Polybius square – Type of code
- Killswitch – a video game urban legend originating from a 2007 short story
- Star Fox Grand Prix – A video game hoax first reported on in May 2018
- Rabbits (podcast) and related novels by Terry Miles (Polybius is featured in the plot)
