= Killswitch (video game) =

Fictional video game

Killswitch is a fictional video game supposedly created by an Eastern European (Soviet or Czechoslovak) company Karvina Corporation in 1989. It originated from a short story written by Catherynne M. Valente for the website InvisibleGames.net in 2007, and was subsequently published in her story collection The Melancholy of Mechagirl. It became the subject of an urban legend that claimed that the game was real.

== Story and gameplay ==
According to the story and the urban legend, the player could choose between two characters to play: a girl called Porto who could change her body size and a demon-like creature called Ghast, and had to navigate through levels in an abandoned coal mine. Ghast was supposedly very difficult to play, so the players normally settled with Porto. However, upon the completion of the game as Porto, it deleted itself from disk, so it was not possible to replay it again as Ghast.

The urban legend also claims that there was a Japanese man called Yamamoto Ryuichi who bought the last available copy of the game at an auction, with the intention to record a playthrough on YouTube. However, the only video released by Ryuchi was that of him crying in front of his PC.

== Cultural analysis and reception ==
Jaroslav Švelch, Assistant Professor in the Department of Media Studies at Charles University, stated that "the game’s presumed origin in the Soviet bloc situates it an undocumented peripheral void where one can project their own fantasies", and that "the story of Killswitch builds on the West’s othering of the Soviet bloc as an exotic locale full of strangeness and mystery, very much akin to orientalism". He also drew parallels between the legend of Killswitch and actual game titles developed in Czechoslovakia in the late 1980s, noting that "Killswitch was never real, yet there were games that may seem equally strange", and "many aspects of Killswitch did, in fact, appear in 1980s Czechoslovak game production".

== See also ==
- Polybius (urban legend)
- List of spurious works of fiction – Fictional works not confirmed to exist
- List of creepypastas
