= Paper street =

Non-existent street on maps or plans

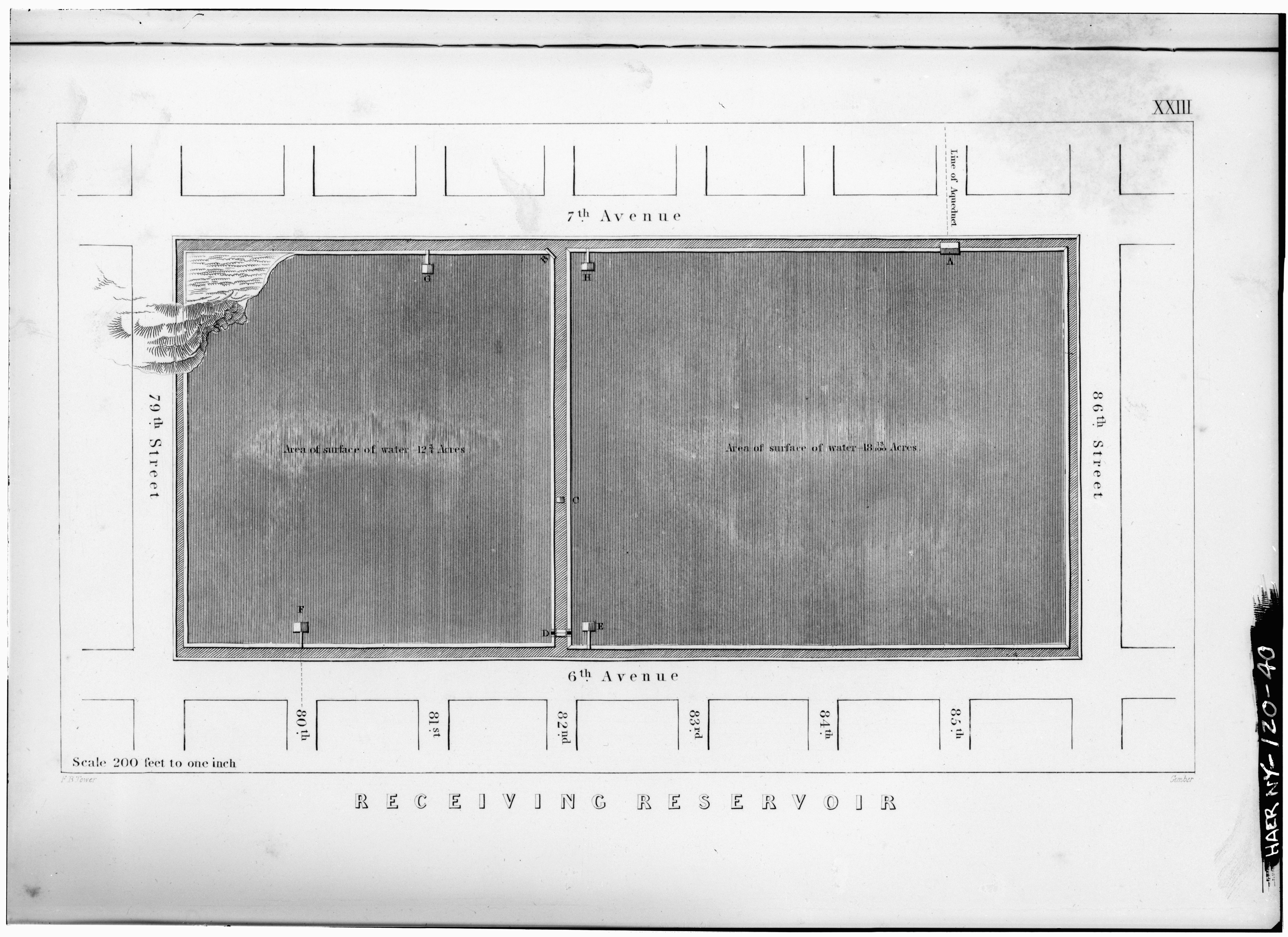
The reservoir in this plan was built. The streets existed legally but were never built.

A paper street or paper road (also known as an Unformed legal road) is a street or road that appears on maps but has not been built.

== Overview ==
Paper streets generally occur when city planners or subdivision developers lay out and dedicate streets that are never built. Commercial street maps based only on official subdivision and land records may show streets which are legally public rights of way though usually undriveable.

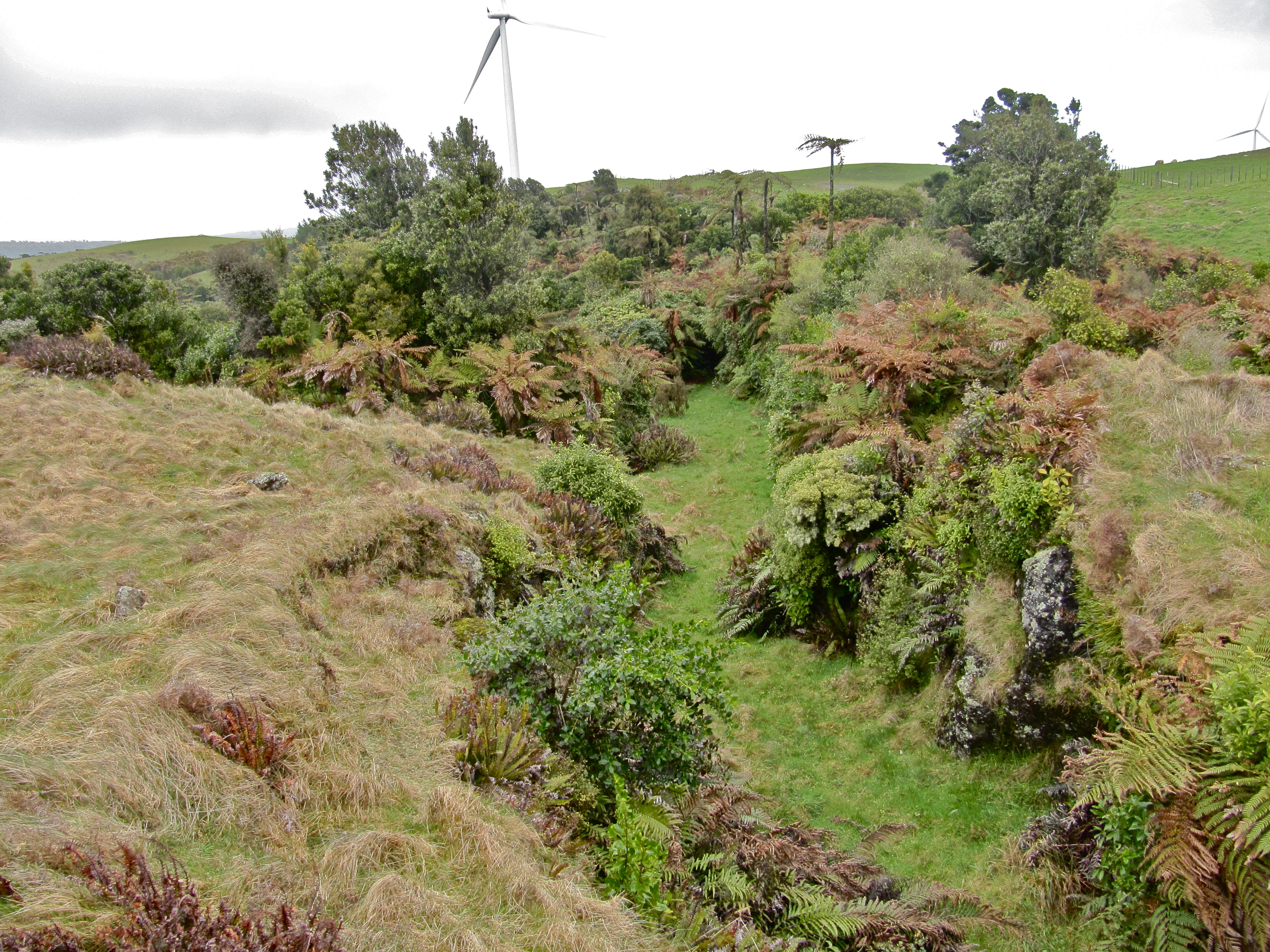
This road near Te Uku Wind Farm was started about 1896 and was part formed when construction stopped about 1914. It drops through a rock cutting about 300 metres long, 3 metres wide and up to 3 metres deep.

Paper roads may exist only on paper, never having been developed, but they have a legal existence and have the same legal status as a formed road. They are especially common in New Zealand, where they were created primarily for future access in rural areas (though in some cases, their layout was determined without checking whether the topography was acceptable for a road). Some districts are reputed to have as many paper roads as actual, formed roads. An estimated 56,000 km (35,000 mi) of paper roads exist in New Zealand.

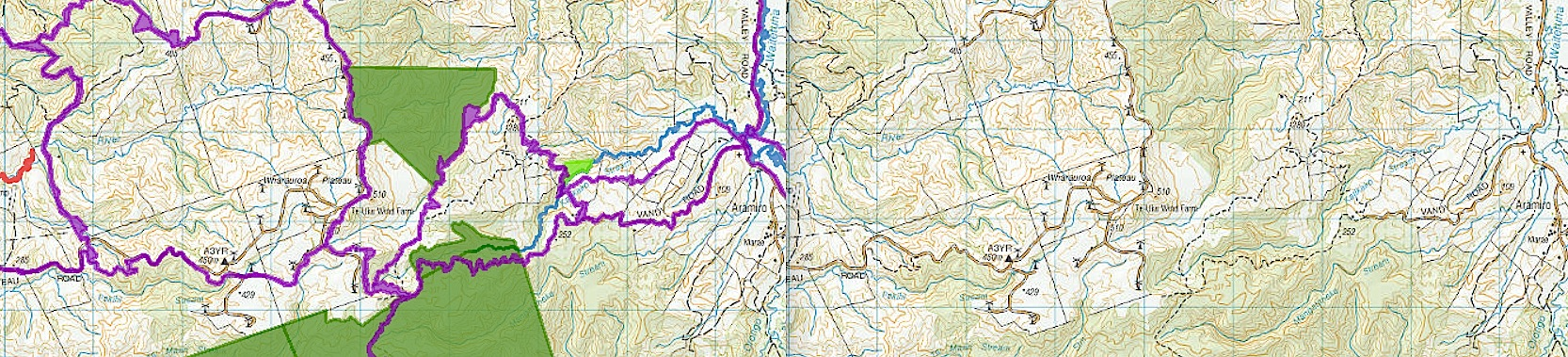
These extracts from a Walking Access Commission map of the area in the photo above, illustrate the extent of paper and actual roads (purple), compared to actual roads only (map on right).

Controversies sometimes arise about the ownership or use of paper roads. Property owners may feel that an abutting undeveloped paper road is part of their property, but other property owners may have rights to access via that road, access which could be developed in the future if the need arises.

The presence of a paper road can affect property valuation since there may be required building setbacks from the road, which might limit development opportunities. Paper streets (and, by extension, paper towns) may be deliberately included in published maps as trap streets, forming a copyright trap. A play on the phrase is found in Chuck Palahniuk's novel Fight Club, as well as the film based on that book, where the protagonist lives in a house on "Paper street". Paper towns play a large role in John Green's novel Paper Towns.

== See also ==
- Easement – Right to use or enter real property
- Fictitious entry – Deliberately incorrect entry in a reference work
- Ghost town – Abandoned settlement with intact features
- Honeytoken – Entries in a database to track stolen data
- Null island – Cartographical (only) marker at 0°N, 0°E
- Trap street – Fictitious street on a map
- Potemkin village – Façade making something seem better than in reality
- Paper township – Type of civil township in Ohio
- Phantom island – Island recorded on maps but proven nonexistent
- Phantom settlement – Settlement on a map that does not exist
