= Dord =

Ghost word created as a dictionary error

The word dord is a dictionary error in lexicography. It was accidentally created, as a ghost word, by the staff of G. and C. Merriam Company (now part of Merriam-Webster) in the New International Dictionary, second edition (1934). That dictionary defined the term as a synonym for density used in physics and chemistry in the following way:

dord (dôrd), n. Physics & Chem. Density.

Philip Babcock Gove, an editor at Merriam-Webster who became editor-in-chief of Webster's Third New International Dictionary, wrote a letter to the journal American Speech, fifteen years after the error was caught, in which he explained how the "dord" error was introduced and corrected.

On 31 July 1931, Austin M. Patterson, the dictionary's chemistry editor, sent in a slip reading "D or d, cont./density." This was intended to add density to the existing list of words that the letter D can abbreviate. The phrase D or d was misinterpreted as a single, run-together word: Dord. This was a plausible mistake because headwords on slips were typed with spaces between the letters, so "D or d" looked very much like "D o r d". The original slip went missing, so a new slip was prepared for the printer, which assigned a part of speech (noun) and a pronunciation. The would-be word was not questioned or corrected by proofreaders. The entry appeared on page 771 of the dictionary in 1934, between the entries for Dorcopsis (a type of small kangaroo) and doré (golden in color).

On 28 February 1939, an editor noticed dord lacked an etymology and investigated, discovering the error. An order was sent to the printer marked "plate change/imperative/urgent". The non-word dord was excised; density was added as an additional meaning for the abbreviation "D or d" as originally intended, and the definition of the adjacent entry Doré furnace was expanded from "A furnace for refining Doré bullion" to "a furnace in which Doré bullion is refined" to close up the space. Gove wrote that this was "probably too bad, for why shouldn't dord mean 'density'?" In 1940, bound books began appearing without the ghost word, although inspection of printed copies well into the 1940s shows dord still present. The entry dord was not completely removed until 1947.

== See also ==
- Boole's rule, a mathematical rule sometimes known as "Bode's rule" due to a typographical error
- Esquivalience
- Fictitious entry
- Frindle, a children's novel in which a fictitious word passes into common parlance
- Mondegreen
- Phono-semantic matching
- Trap street
