= Ghost word =

Word created by error in a dictionary

In linguistics, a ghost word, phantom word, lexical ghost, or vox nihili, is a word published in a dictionary or similarly authoritative reference work even though it had not previously had any meaning or been used intentionally. A ghost word generally originates from readers interpreting a typographical or linguistic error as a word they are not familiar with, and then publishing that word elsewhere under the misconception that it is an established part of the language.

Once authoritatively published, a ghost word occasionally may be copied widely and enter legitimate usage, or it may eventually be discovered and removed from dictionaries.

== Origin ==
Philologist Walter William Skeat first coined the term in 1886, during his annual address to the Philological Society as its president:

Of all the work which the Society has at various times undertaken, none has ever had so much interest for us, collectively, as the New English Dictionary. Dr Murray, as you will remember, wrote on one occasion a most able article, in order to justify himself in omitting from the Dictionary the word abacot, defined by Webster as "the cap of state formerly used by English kings, wrought into the figure of two crowns". It was rightly and wisely rejected by our Editor on the ground that there is no such word, the alleged form being due to a complete mistake ... due to the blunders of printers or scribes, or to the perfervid imaginations of ignorant or blundering editors. ...

I propose, therefore, to bring under your notice a few more words of the abacot type; words which will come under our Editor's notice in course of time, and which I have little doubt that he will reject. As it is convenient to have a short name for words of this character, I shall take leave to call them "ghost-words." ... I only allow the title of ghost-words to such words, or rather forms, as have no meaning whatever.

... I can adduce at least two that are somewhat startling. The first is kime ... The original ... appeared in the Edinburgh Review for 1808. "The Hindoos ... have some very savage customs ... Some swing on hooks, some run kimes through their hands ..."

It turned out that "kimes" was a misprint for "knives", but the word gained currency for some time. Skeat continued with a more drastic example:

A similar instance occurs in a misprint of a passage of one of Walter Scott's novels, but here there is the further amusing circumstance that the etymology of the false word was settled to the satisfaction of some of the readers. In the majority of editions of The Monastery, we read: ... dost thou so soon morse thoughts of slaughter? This word is nothing but a misprint of nurse; but in Notes and Queries two independent correspondents accounted for the word morse etymologically. One explained it as to prime, as when one primes a musket, from O. Fr. amorce, powder for the touchhole (Cotgrave), and the other by to bite (Lat. mordere), hence "to indulge in biting, stinging or gnawing thoughts of slaughter". The latter writes: "That the word as a misprint should have been printed and read by millions for fifty years without being challenged and altered exceeds the bounds of probability." Yet when the original manuscript of Sir Walter Scott was consulted, it was found that the word was there plainly written nurse.

One edition of The Monastery containing the misprint was published by the Edinburgh University Press in 1820.

== More examples ==
In his address, Skeat exhibited about 100 more specimens that he had collected.

Other examples include:

- The supposed Homeric Greek word στήτη (stētē) = 'woman', which arose thus: In Iliad Book 1 line 6 is the phrase διαστήτην ἐρίσαντε (diastētēn erisante) = "two (i.e. Achilles and Agamemnon) stood apart making strife". However someone unfamiliar with dual number verb inflections read it as διά στήτην ἐρίσαντε (dia stētēn erisante) = "two making strife because of a stētē", and they guessed that stētē meant the woman Briseis who was the subject of the strife, influenced by the fact that nouns ending with eta are usually feminine.
- The placename Sarum, which arose by misunderstanding of the abbreviation Sar~ used in a medieval manuscript to mean some early form such as "Sarisberie" (= Salisbury).
- As an example of an editing mistake, dord was defined as a noun meaning density (mass per unit volume). When the second edition of Webster's New International Dictionary was being prepared, an index card that read "D or d" with reference to the word density was incorrectly misfiled as a word instead of an abbreviation. The entry existed in more than one printing from 1934 to 1947.
- A Concise Dictionary of Pronunciation (ISBN 978-0-19-863156-9) accidentally included the nonexistent word testentry (evidently a feature of work-in-progress), with spurious British and US pronunciations as though it rhymed with pedantry.
- The OED explains the ghost word phantomnation as "Appearance of a phantom; illusion. Error for phantom nation". Alexander Pope's (1725) translation of the Odyssey originally said, "The Phantome-nations of the dead". Richard Paul Jodrell's (1820) Philology of the English Language, which omitted hyphens from compounds, entered it as one word, "Phantomnation, a multitude of spectres". Lexicographers copied this error into various dictionaries, such as, "Phantomnation, illusion. Pope." (Worcester, 1860, Philology of the English Language), and "Phantomnation, appearance as of a phantom; illusion. (Obs. and rare.) Pope." (Webster, 1864, An American dictionary of the English language).
- The Japanese word kusege (癖毛, compounding kuse 癖 'habit'; 'vice' and 毛 ke 'hair', 'frizzy hair') was mistranslated as "vicious hair" in the authoritative Kenkyūsha's New Japanese-English Dictionary from the first edition (1918) to the fourth (1974), and corrected in the fifth edition (2003) "twisted [kinky, frizzy] hair; hair that stands up". This may have originated through false analogy from Kenkyusha's waraguse (悪癖 "bad/vicious habit; vice") entries. This ghost word was not merely an unnoticed lexicographical error; generations of dictionary users copied the mistake. For example, a Tokyo hospital of cosmetic surgery had a long-running display advertisement in the Asian edition of Newsweek that read, "Kinky or vicious hair may be changed to a lovely, glossy hair" [sic]. This hair-straightening ad was jokingly used in the "Kinky Vicious" title of a 2011 Hong Kong iPhoneography photo exhibition.
- The JIS X 0208 standard, the most widespread system to handle Japanese language with computers since 1978, has entries for 12 kanji that have no known use and were probably included by mistake (for example 彁). They are called ghost characters (yūrei moji, "ghost characters") and are still supported by most computer systems (see: JIS X 0208#Kanji from unknown sources).
- Hsigo, an apparently erroneous output from optical character recognition software for "hsiao", a creature from Chinese mythology. The typographical error appeared in several limited-audience publications but spread around the World Wide Web after the creation of a Wikipedia article about the term (which has since been corrected), due to its numerous mirrors and forks.
- In his book Beyond Language: Adventures in Word and Thought, Dmitri Borgmann shows how feamyng, a purported collective noun for ferrets which appeared in several dictionaries, is actually the result of a centuries-long chain of typographical or misread-handwriting errors (from Busyness to Besyness to Fesynes to Fesnyng to Feamyng).
- In the Irish language, the word cigire ('inspector') was invented by the scholar Tadhg Ua Neachtain, who misread cighim (pronounced [ˈciːmʲ], like modern cím) in Edward Lhuyd's Archaeologia Britannica as cigim [ˈcɪɟɪmʲ], and so constructed the verbal forms cigire, cigireacht, cigirim etc. from it.
- In Estonian, the verb tuvastama ('to ascertain, identify') originates from a typographical error of the transcription of turvastama (from the root turvaline, 'secure', 'certain').

== Speculative examples ==
Many neologisms, including those that eventually develop into established usages, are of obscure origin, and some might well have originated as ghost words through illiteracy, such as the term okay. However, establishing the true origin often is not possible, partly for lack of documentation, and sometimes through obstructive efforts on the part of pranksters. The most popular etymology of the word pumpernickel bread—that Napoleon described it as "C'est pain pour Nicole!", being only fit for his horse—is thought to be a deliberate hoax. Quiz also has been associated with apparently deliberate false etymology. All these words and many more have remained in common usage, but they may well have been ghost words in origin.

== Distinguished from back-formation ==
A recent, incorrect use of the term "ghost word" refers to coining a new word inferred from a real word by falsely applying an etymological rule. The correct term for such a derivation is back-formation, a word that has been established since the late 19th century. "Beforemath" is an example, derived from "aftermath", having an understandable meaning but not a commonly accepted word. A back-formation cannot become a ghost word; as a rule it would clash with Skeat's precise definition, which requires that the word forms have "no meaning".

== See also ==
- Corruption (linguistics)
- Fictitious entry
- Funistrada, a fictional food name, created as a control item in a survey
- Ghost characters
- Folk etymology
- Trap street – a fictitious street inserted into maps for copyright protection
