= Fictitious entry =

Deliberately incorrect entry in a reference work

Fictitious or fake entries are deliberately incorrect entries in reference works such as dictionaries, encyclopedias, maps, and directories, added by the editors as copyright traps to reveal subsequent plagiarism or copyright infringement. There are more specific terms for particular kinds of fictitious entry, such as Mountweazel, trap street, paper town, phantom settlement, and nihilartikel.

== Terminology ==
The neologism Mountweazel was coined by The New Yorker writer Henry Alford in an article that mentioned a fictitious biographical entry intentionally placed as a copyright trap in the 1975 New Columbia Encyclopedia. The entry described Lillian Virginia Mountweazel as a fountain designer turned photographer, who died in an explosion while on assignment for Combustibles magazine. Allegedly, she was widely known for her photo-essays of unusual subject matter, including New York City buses, the cemeteries of Paris, and rural American mailboxes. According to the encyclopedia's editor, it is a tradition for encyclopedias to put a fake entry to trap competitors for plagiarism. The surname came to be associated with all such fictitious entries.

The term nihilartikel, combining the Latin nihil ("nothing") and German Artikel ("article"), is sometimes used.

== Copyright traps ==
By including a trivial piece of false information in a larger work, it is easier to demonstrate plagiarism if the fictitious entry is copied along with other material. An admission of this motive appears in the preface to Chambers' 1964 mathematical tables, "those [errors] that are known to exist form an uncomfortable trap for any would-be plagiarist". Similarly, trap streets may be included in a map or invented phone numbers in a telephone directory.

Fictitious entries may be used to demonstrate copying but to prove legal infringement, the material must also be shown to be eligible for copyright (see Feist v. Rural, Fred Worth lawsuit or Nester's Map & Guide Corp. v. Hagstrom Map Co., 796 F.Supp. 729, E.D.N.Y., 1992).

=== Reference works ===
- In August 2005, The New Oxford American Dictionary gained media coverage when it was leaked that the second edition contained at least one fictional entry. This later was determined to be the word "esquivalience", defined as "the wilful avoidance of one's official responsibilities", which had been added to the edition published in 2001. It was intended as a copyright trap, as the text of the book was distributed electronically and thus easy to copy.
- David Pogue, author of several books offering tips and tricks for computer users, deliberately placed a bogus tip in one of his books as a way of catching plagiarism. The fake tip, which purported to make a rabbit appear on the computer screen when certain keys were pressed, did appear in later works.
- In addition to the 1975 New Columbia Encyclopedia entry on Lillian Virginia Mountweazel, the editors created another fictitious entry concerning the purported blind American artist, Robert Dayton. The article claims Dayton experimented "with odor-emitting gases that resemble pungent body odors." His supposed "Aroma-Art" is presented in a sealed chamber where an audience inhales scented air.
- The German-language medical encyclopedia Pschyrembel Klinisches Wörterbuch features an entry on the Steinlaus (stone louse), a rock-eating animal. This was originally included as a copyright trap. The scientific name Petrophaga lorioti implies its origin: a creation of the German humorist Loriot. The Pschyrembel entry was removed in 1996 but, after reader protests, was restored the next year, with an extended section on the role of the stone louse in the fall of the Berlin Wall.
- Webster's New Twentieth Century Dictionary of the English Language once contained an entry for the fictitious bird jungftak: "Persian bird, the male of which had only one wing, on the right side, and the female only one wing, on the left side; instead of the missing wings, the male had a hook of bone, and the female an eyelet of bone, and it was by uniting hook and eye that they were enabled to fly — each, when alone, had to remain on the ground."

=== Maps ===
Fictitious entries on maps may be called phantom settlements, trap streets, paper towns, cartographer's follies, or other names. They are intended to help reveal copyright infringements. They are not to be confused with paper streets, which are streets which are planned but as of the printing of the map have not yet been built.

- In 1978, the fictional American towns of Beatosu and Goblu in Ohio were inserted into that year's official state of Michigan map as nods to the University of Michigan and its traditional rival, The Ohio State University.
- The fictional town of Agloe, New York in the United States was invented by mapmakers Ernest Alpens and Otto Lindberg in the 1930s by mixing up their initials, but eventually became identified as a real place by its county administration because a building, the Agloe General Store, was erected at its fictional location. The "town" is featured in the novel Paper Towns by John Green and its film adaptation. Agloe is also featured prominently in the 2022 novel The Cartographers by Peng Shepherd.
- Mount Richard, a fictitious peak on the continental divide in the United States, appeared on county maps in the early 1970s. It was believed to be the work of a draftsman, Richard Ciacci. The nonexistence of the mountain was undiscovered for two years.
- In the United Kingdom in 2001, the Ordnance Survey (OS) obtained a £20m out-of-court settlement from the Automobile Association (the AA) after content from OS maps was reproduced on AA maps. The Ordnance Survey denied including "deliberate mistakes" in its maps as copyright traps, claiming the "fingerprints" which identified a copy were stylistic features such as the width of roads.
- The 2002 Geographers A-Z Map of Manchester contains traps. For example, Dickinson Street in central Manchester is falsely named "Philpott St".
- The non-existent town of Argleton's appearance in Google Maps was investigated by Steve Punt in an episode of the BBC Radio 4 programme Punt P.I. The programme concluded that the town's entry may well have originated as a copyright trap.

=== Trivia books ===
- Fred L. Worth, the author of The Trivia Encyclopedia, placed deliberately false information about the first name of TV detective Columbo for copy-trap purposes. He later sued the creators of Trivial Pursuit, as they had based some of their questions and answers on entries found in the work. The suit was unsuccessful, as the makers of Trivial Pursuit were able to show that the game was based on questions and answers about facts obtained from a number of sources, and the information was laid out in a way that was demonstrably different from the original "encyclopedia".

=== Other copyright infringement ===
- In the summer of 2008, the state-owned Slovak Hydrometeorological Institute (Slovak: Slovenský hydrometeorologický ústav, short: SHMÚ) suspected that a competing commercial service, the website meteo.sk, was copying their data. (This is legal in most countries, where such data is either offered under a free license or deeded into the public domain, but not in Slovakia.) On 7 August 2008, SHMÚ deliberately altered the temperature for Chopok from 9.5 °C to 1 °C. In a short time, the temperature of 1 °C appeared for Chopok at meteo.sk as well.
- Google, alleging its search results for a misspelling of tarsorrhaphy started appearing in Bing results partway through the summer of 2010, created fabricated search results where a hundred query terms like "hiybbprqag", "delhipublicschool40 chdjob" and "juegosdeben1ogrande" each returned a link to a single unrelated webpage. Nine of the hundred fraudulent results planted by Google were later observed as the first result for the bogus term on Bing.
- In 2019, media company Genius revealed that they had caught Google reprinting their song lyrics as "Featured Snippets" on top of Google search result pages. The former company used a mix of two different types of apostrophes (curly and straight) in several of their song lyrics. When converted to Morse code, these apostrophes spelled out the phrase "Red Handed".

== Scrutiny checks ==
Some publications such as those published by Harvard biologist John Bohannon are used to detect lack of academic scrutiny, editorial oversight, fraud, or data dredging on the part of authors or their publishers. Trap publications may be used by publishers to immediately reject articles citing them, or by academics to detect journals of ill repute (those that would publish them or works citing them).

A survey of food tastes by the US Army in the 1970s included "funistrada", "buttered ermal", and "braised trake" to control for inattentive answers.

In 1985, the fictitious town of Ripton, Massachusetts, was "created" in an effort to protest the ignorance of state officials about rural areas. The town received a budget appropriation and several grants before the hoax was revealed.

== Humorous hoaxes ==
=== Reference publications ===
- The German-language Der neue Pauly. Enzyklopaedie der Antike, edited by H. Cancik and H. Schneider, vol. 1 (Stuttgart, 1996, ISBN 3-476-01470-3) includes a fictitious entry now well known amongst classicists: a deadpan description of an entirely fictional Roman sport, apopudobalia, which resembles modern association football.
- Zzxjoanw was the last entry in Rupert Hughes's Music Lovers' Encyclopedia of 1903, and it continued as an entry in subsequent editions down to the 1950s. It was described as a Māori word for drum, fife, or conclusion. It was proved to be a hoax, as the Māori language does not use the letters J, X or Z.
- Most listings of the members of the German parliament feature the fictitious politician Jakob Maria Mierscheid, allegedly a member of the parliament since 1979. Among other activities, he is reported to have contributed to a major symposium on the equally fictitious stone louse in Frankfurt.
- The 1975 New Columbia Encyclopedia contains a fictitious entry on Lillian Virginia Mountweazel (1942–1973). Her biography claims she was a fountain designer and photographer, best known for Flags Up!, a collection of photographs of rural American mailboxes. Supposedly, she was born in Bangs, Ohio, and died in an explosion while on assignment for Combustibles magazine. Mountweazel was the subject of an exhibit in Dublin, Ireland, in March 2009 examining her fictitious life and works.
- The first printing in 1980 of The New Grove Dictionary of Music and Musicians contains two fictitious entries: on Guglielmo Baldini, a nonexistent Italian composer, and Dag Henrik Esrum-Hellerup, who purportedly composed a small amount of music for flute. Esrum-Hellerup's surname derives from a Danish village and a suburb in Copenhagen. The two entries were removed from later editions, as well as from later printings of the 1980 edition.
- The Prosopographie der mittelbyzantinischen Zeit includes entries from Tales of Maghrebinia, a 1953 collection of short stories by Gregor von Rezzori set in a fictional Balkan country.

=== Practical jokes ===
- Rhinogradentia are a fictitious mammalian order, extensively documented in a series of articles and books by the equally fictitious German naturalist Harald Stümpke. Allegedly, both the animals and the scientist were the creations of Gerolf Steiner, a zoology professor at the University of Heidelberg.
- Taro Tsujimoto is a fictional character often included in Buffalo Sabres reference works. Tsujimoto, an alleged Japanese forward, was the creation of Sabres general manager George "Punch" Imlach, designed to fool the National Hockey League during the 1974 NHL amateur draft; Imlach drafted Tsujimoto and only months later—well after the pick was made official—admitted that the league had been fooled by the fictitious player.
- Franz Bibfeldt is a fictitious theologian created by Robert Howard Clausen for a footnote in a student paper. Bibfeldt was later popularized by Clausen's classmate Martin Marty as an ongoing injoke among theologians, including a book and a parody lecture series at the University of Chicago Divinity School.
- Sports Illustrated commissioned an April 1, 1985 cover story from George Plimpton on "The Curious Case of Sidd Finch", a fictitious self-taught baseball player who could pitch a baseball as fast as 168 mph (270 km/h).
- At least two sports teams at Georgia Tech have long included George P. Burdell, a fictitious student originally created as a practical joke by a Tech student in 1927, in their lists of lettermen in team media guides:
  - Football: Lists Burdell as a letterman in the 1928, 1929, and 1930 seasons.
  - Men's basketball: Lists Burdell as a letterman in the 1955–56, 1956–57, and 1957–58 seasons.
- Jean-Baptiste Botul is a fictional French philosopher created in 1995 by the journalist Frédéric Pagès and other members of a group calling itself the Association of the Friends of Jean-Baptiste Botul. Originating as a literary hoax, the names of both Botul and his philosophy of botulism derive from botulism, an often deadly type of food poisoning. The works of Botul have been cited by authors who missed the joke, including most notably TV personality Bernard-Henri Lévy.

=== Puzzles and games ===
- Australian paleontologist Tim Flannery's book Astonishing Animals includes one imaginary animal and leaves it up to the reader to distinguish which one it is.
- The product catalog for Swedish personal-use electronics and hobby articles retailer Teknikmagasinet contains a fictitious product. Finding that product is a contest, Blufftävlingen, in which the best suggestion for another fictitious product from someone who spotted the product gets included in the next issue.
- Muse, a US magazine for children 10–14, regularly includes a two-page spread containing science and technology news. One of the news stories is false and readers are encouraged to guess which one.
- Games (a magazine devoted to games and puzzles) used to include a fake advertisement in each issue as one of the magazine's regular games.
- The book The Golden Turkey Awards describes many bizarre and obscure films. The authors of the work state that one film described by the book is a hoax, which they challenged readers to identify. The imaginary film was Dog of Norway, supposedly starring Muki the Wonder Dog, named after the authors' own dog. (A clue is that the same dog shown in a purported publicity shot for the 1948 film, also appears next to the authors in the "About The Authors" bio on the back cover.)

== Fictitious entries in works of fiction ==
- Jorge Luis Borges's short story "Tlön, Uqbar, Orbis Tertius" tells of an encyclopedia entry on what turns out to be the imaginary country of Uqbar. This leads the narrator to the equally fantastic region of Tlön, the setting for much of the country's literature. Borges went on to invent the Celestial Emporium of Benevolent Knowledge, purportedly an ancient Chinese encyclopedia, two years later.
- In Cordwainer Smith's 1961 short story "Mother Hitton's Littul Kittons", agents of Norstrilia plant a fake article about the titular "kittons" in an encyclopedia consulted by a thief, in order to deceive him about the nature of their planet's defenses.
- In the Fred Saberhagen short story, "The Annihilation of Angkor Apeiron" a Berserker ship comes to grief after trying to find a nonexistent star system inserted into an encyclopedia to catch plagiarists.
- Agloe, New York, is a key plot point in John Green's 2008 novel Paper Towns and its film adaptation. The novels also references the fictitious entry "Lillian Mountweazel" with the name of the Spiegelman family's dog, Myrna Mountweazel.
- In Eley Williams's novel The Liar's Dictionary (2020), the protagonist is tasked with hunting down several fictitious entries inserted in Swansby's New Encyclopaedic Dictionary before the work is digitized.
- In the Inside No. 9 episode "Misdirection", Mountweazel is used to prove the plagiarism of a magic trick.
- The Doctor Who episode "Face the Raven" revolves around the idea of "trap streets", in this case located in London.

== Legal action ==
Fictitious entries may be used to demonstrate copying, but to prove legal infringement, the material must also be shown to be eligible for copyright. However, due to the decision in Feist v. Rural that "information alone without a minimum of original creativity cannot be protected by copyright", there are very few cases in which copyright has been proven, and many are dismissed.

- Fred L. Worth, author of The Trivia Encyclopedia, filed a $300 million lawsuit against the distributors of Trivial Pursuit. He claimed that more than a quarter of the questions in the game's Genus Edition had been taken from his books, including his own fictitious entries that he had added to the books to catch anyone who wanted to violate his copyright. However, the case was dismissed by the district court judge after the Trivial Pursuit inventors argued successfully that facts are not protected by copyright.
- In Nester's Map & Guide Corp. v. Hagstrom Map Co., a New York corporation that published and sold Official New York Taxi Driver's Guide sued Hagstrom Map Corporation for publishing and selling New York City Taxi & Limousine Drivers Guide, alleging violation of the Copyright Act of 1976. A United States District Court found that Nester's selection of addresses involved a sufficient level of creativity to be eligible for copyright, and enjoined Hagstrom from copying that portion of the guide. However, the court also found that fictitious entries (in this case, a "trap street") are not themselves protected by copyright.
- In Alexandria Drafting Co. v. Andrew H. Amsterdam dba Franklin Maps, Alexandria Drafting Corporation filed suit against Franklin Maps alleging that Franklin Maps had violated the Copyright Act of 1976 by copying their map books. The case was dismissed, because while the judge concluded that there was a single instance of original copyright, this was held not to be sufficient evidence to support a claim for copyright infringement. Additionally, the judge cited Nester's Map & Guide Corp. v. Hagstrom Map Co. as precedent for conclusion that "fictitious names may not be copyrighted" and "the existence, or non-existence, of a road is a non-copyrightable fact."

== Simple errors ==
Often there will be errors in maps, dictionaries, and other publications, that are not deliberate and thus are not fictitious entries. For example, within dictionaries there are such mistakes known as ghost words, "words which have no real existence [...] being mere coinages due to the blunders of printers or scribes, or to the perfervid imaginations of ignorant or blundering editors."

== See also ==
- Canary trap
- Digital watermarking
- Honeypot (computing)
- Substantial similarity § Striking similarity
- List of hoaxes
- Sting operation
- Lexicographic error
- List of hoaxes on Wikipedia
