= Argleton =

Phantom settlement in England on Google Maps

Coordinates: 53.543°N 2.912°W

- Google Maps location
- Aerial view of the locality. One field is marked with a red pin and labelled "Argleton". A nearby settlement is marked "Aughton".
- Created by: Google LLC

In-universe information
- Type: Copyright trap or mistake
- Locations: West Lancashire, England

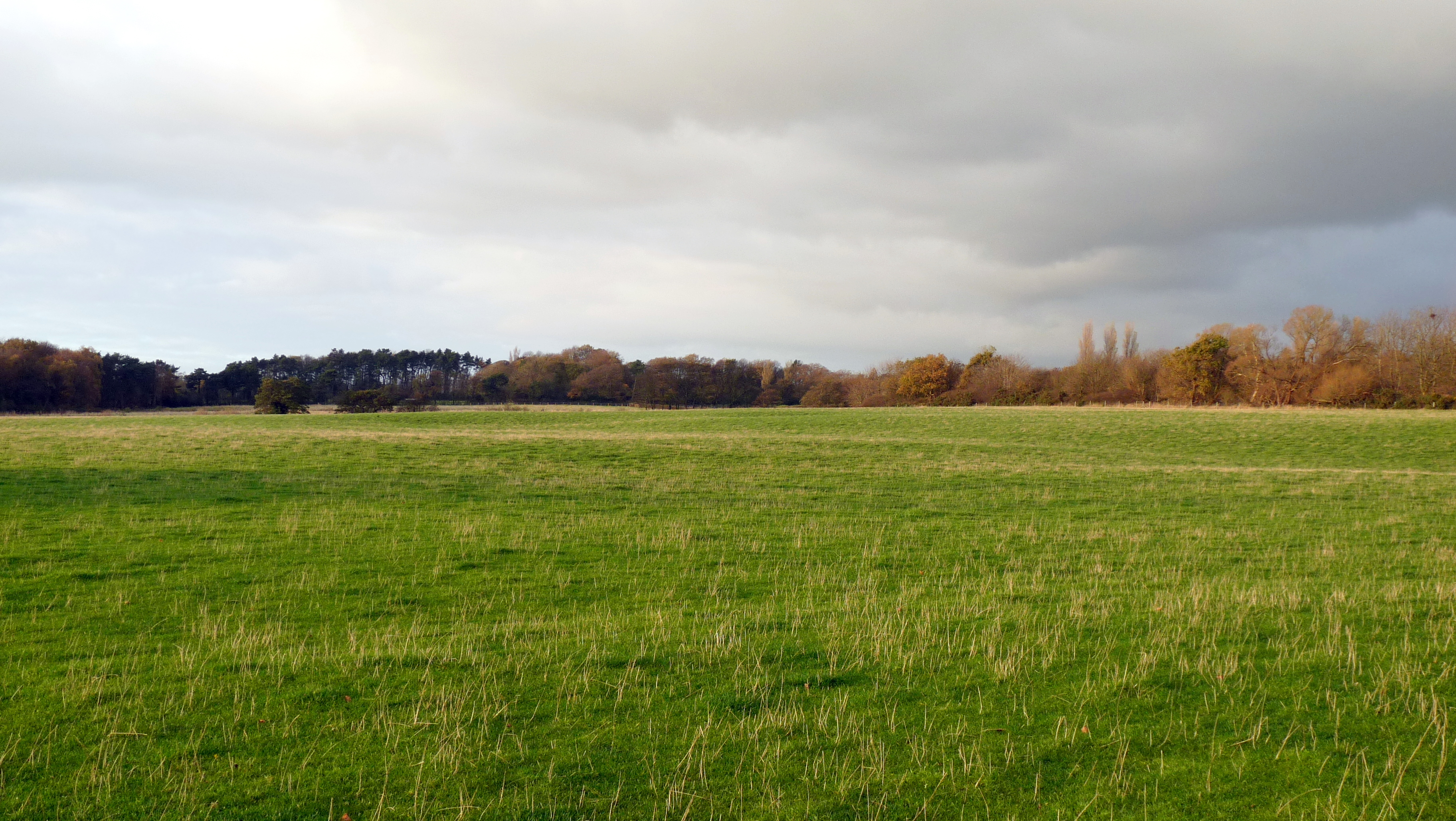
View of an empty field from Bold Lane in Aughton, looking north towards the supposed location of Argleton.

Argleton was a phantom settlement that appeared on Google Maps and Google Earth but was later removed by Google. The supposed location of Argleton was between the A59 road and Town Green railway station within the civil parish of Aughton in West Lancashire, England, in an area of empty fields. Data from Google is used by other online information services, which consequently treated Argleton as a real settlement within the L39 postcode area. As a result, some web services described local businesses from the postcode district as being located in Argleton, and gave weather reports for the area.

== Media interest ==
The anomaly was first written about by Mike Nolan, head of web services at nearby Edge Hill University, who posted about it on his blog in September 2008. In early 2009, it was investigated further by Nolan's colleague, Roy Bayfield, who walked to the area shown on Google Maps to see if there was anything special about it. Bayfield commented about it on his own blog and described the place as being "deceptively normal" as well as exploring the concept of a non-existent place using the tropes of magic realism and psychogeography; the story was later picked up by the local media. By November 2009, news of the non-existent town had received global media attention, and "Argleton" became a hashtag on Twitter. As of 23 December 2009, a Google search for "Argleton" was generating around 249,000 hits, and the domain names argleton.com (with the message, "What the hell are they talking about? We, the good citizens of Argleton do exist. Here we are now!") and argleton-village.co.uk (a spoof website describing the history of Argleton, famous "Argletonians" and current events in the fictional village) were claimed. Other websites were selling merchandise with slogans such as "I visited Argleton and all I got was this T-shirt" and "New York, London, Paris, Argleton".

On 18 September 2010, the BBC Radio 4 programme Punt PI hosted by Steve Punt investigated the case of Argleton.

== Explanations ==
One possible explanation for the presence of Argleton is that it was added deliberately as a copyright trap, or "paper town" as they are sometimes known, to catch any violations of copyright, though such bogus entries are typically much less obvious. It has been noted that "Argle" seems to echo the word "Google", while the name is also an anagram of "Not Large" and "Not Real G", with the letter G perhaps representing Google. Alternatively, it has been suggested that "Argleton" is merely a misspelling of "Aughton", although both names appear on the map. "Argle" is also a somewhat common metasyntactic variable, the kind of placeholder names used by computer programmers. "Argle-bargle" is slang for "an argument" or "to argue." Professor Danny Dorling, president of the Society of Cartographers, considered it more likely that Argleton was nothing more than an "innocent mistake".

A spokesman for Google stated that "While the vast majority of this information is correct there are occasional errors", and encouraged users to report any issues directly to their data provider. Data for Google Maps are provided by Netherlands-based Tele Atlas; the latter was unable to explain how such anomalies could get into their database, but said that Argleton would be removed from the map. By May 2010, the location had been removed from Google Maps.

== See also ==
- Beatosu and Goblu, Ohio
- Phantom island
- Agloe, New York
