= Franz Bibfeldt =

Hoax regarding fictitious theologian

Franz Bibfeldt is a fictitious German theologian and in-joke among American academic theologians.

Bibfeldt made his first appearance as the author of an invented footnote in a term paper of a Concordia Seminary student, Robert Howard Clausen. Clausen's classmate, Martin Marty, adopted the name for continued satire and Bibfeldt became a running joke for Martin and his friends. His birthdate and baptismal day was set as November 1, 1897. In 1951, Marty's review of Bibfeldt's The Relieved Paradox was published in the Concordia Seminarian. When the ruse was uncovered, Marty's fellowship to study overseas was revoked, and he instead enrolled in the University of Chicago, where he spent the rest of his academic career.

Since then most Bibfeldt writings and talks have come out of the University of Chicago, where a tradition exists of a Donnelley Stool of Bibfeldt Studies. Targets of Bibfeldt-related content include conservative theologians who maintain the historical consistency of their causes, neo-orthodoxes, those who pander to donors or cultural whims, compromisers lacking moral backbone, and American evangelicals. Bibfeldt's bibliography includes his doctoral thesis, "The Problem of the Year Zero"; his response to Søren Kierkegaard's Either/Or, titled Both/And, as well as the subsequent reconsideration Either/Or and/or Both/And; and his argument for the Mesopotamian origins of baseball, The Boys of Sumer. Most of the content was collected in The Unrelieved Paradox: Studies in the Theology of Franz Bibfeldt (ISBN 0-8028-0745-3) edited by Marty and Jerald C. Brauer, which includes a discussion of "Proofs of the Existence of Franz Bibfeldt." One of Bibfeldt's most famous quotations is "Pragmatism is fine, as long as it works."

A Swedish parallel is the fictitious theologian Elof Sundin at Uppsala University since the early 1960s.
