= Stone louse =

Fictitious animal

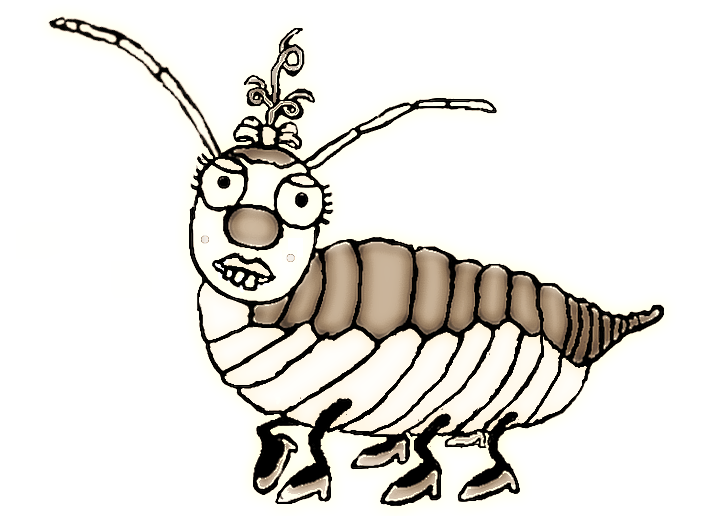
Stone louse (female)

The stone louse (Petrophaga lorioti, in German Steinlaus) is a fictitious animal created by German humorist Loriot in 1976 to parody nature documentaries. It was primarily featured in a video sketch, as well as being a fictitious entry in the German medical encyclopedic dictionary Pschyrembel Klinisches Wörterbuch.

== Characteristics ==
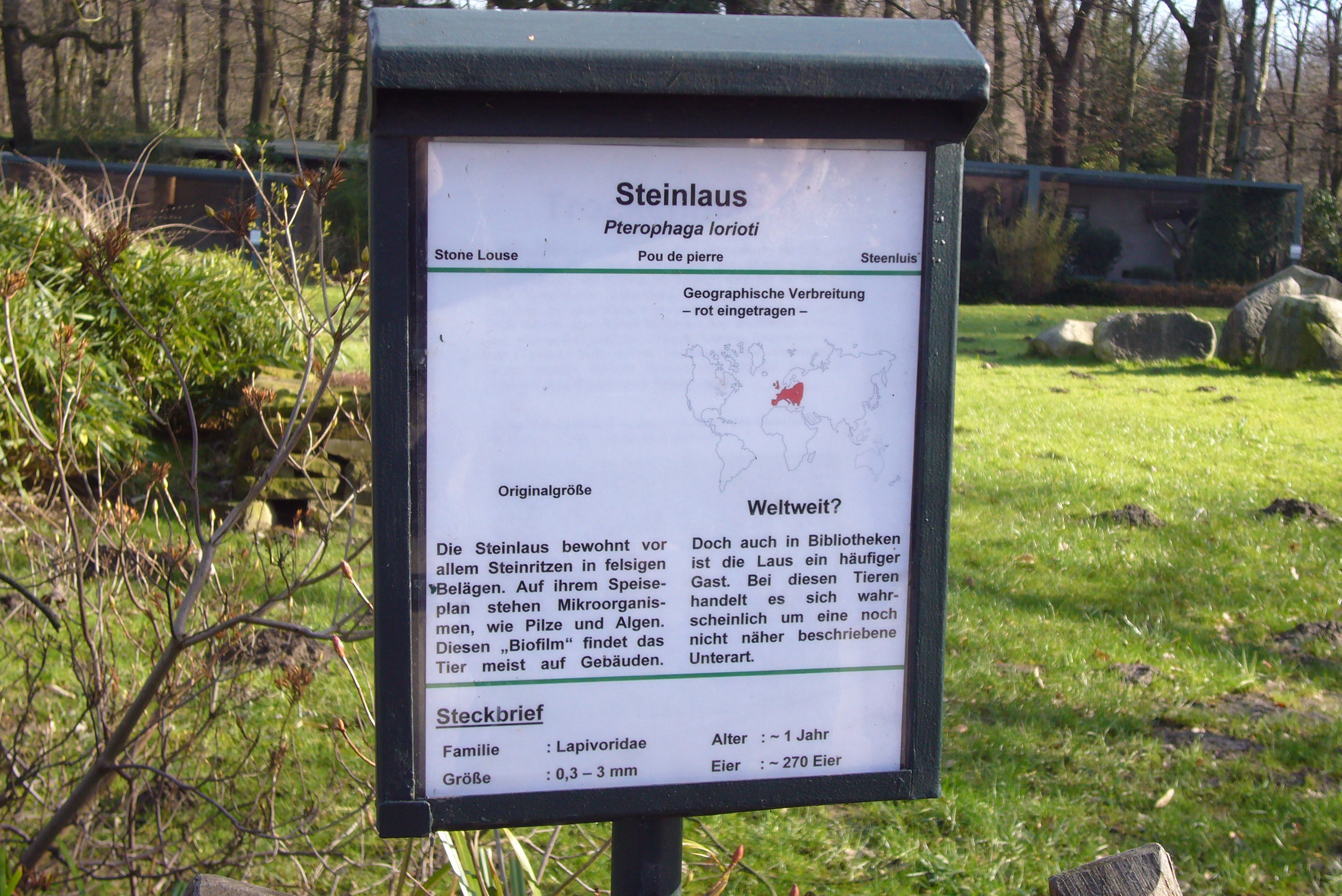
"Habitat" of the stone louse in Dortmund Zoo; note that the "genus" name is misspelled

Loriot created a popular mockumentary titled The Stone-Louse, a parody of Ein Platz für Tiere ("A Place for Animals"), a longstanding TV series about endangered wildlife by the famous German zoologist and documentary filmmaker Dr. Bernhard Grzimek (ARD, 20.47-51). The mockumentary chronicles Loriot's 1976 "discovery" of the stone-louse.

The "science documentary" describes the stone-louse as a rodent-like mite in the order "Fictional Rodents", 20 to 24 mm (3/4 to 1 in) long which consumes about 28 kilograms (62 lb) of stone per day, depending on the density and tastiness of said stone. Loriot gives some deadpan comments on a filmed building implosion, mentioning the "shy rodent" to be at lunch in its natural habitat (before the implosion). As the building vanishes into dust and rubble in the background, Loriot caringly speaks about the "possierliche kleine Nager" ("endearing little rodents") and concludes with some "alarming" points about the endangered status of the entire species.

== Publication in Pschyrembel ==
In 1983, the clinical dictionary Pschyrembel, from German scientific publisher Walter de Gruyter, contained information about the stone louse for the first time in printed form. The short article is thought to be based mainly on Loriot's TV documentary.

Extending Loriot's parody, the Pschyrembel informs about the louse's "value" in fighting bladder, gall and kidney stones. The subspecies "gallstone louse" and "kidney stone louse" are mentioned only briefly due to "lack of further scientific data".

In the 257th edition of the Pschyrembel, the authors omitted the fictitious entry. The following edition, in 1997, featured it again due to protests from readers and was presented on Frankfurt Book Fair as the correct "Steinlaus inside" version.

Recently discovered "insights" found their way into this new version, which even speculated about the stone louse's participation in the fall of the Berlin Wall, since the wall was mainly placed in areas "commonly inhabited by the stone louse". That theory was reinforced by "discoveries" that the stone louse might have been used by the Spartans to bring down the ancient Athenians' Long Walls. Other hypotheses connect the stone louse with the end of the Stone Age.

The Pschyrembel denies that the stone louse has become extinct, and refers to recent "sightings" by a local expert on stone lice, "Dr. Schlereth", at construction sites in Kronach, Bavaria. The 260th edition extends the article even further, referring to results in homeopathy.

== Further publications and sightings ==
The fictional Member of Parliament Jakob Maria Mierscheid has contributed to the (fictional) 3. Hoechster Steinlaus-Symposium, XII (3) in Frankfurt.

A contribution to a Senckenberg Museum Symposium in Frankfurt in 1999 mentioned "dangers" posed by stone lice to the protection of architectural heritage and monuments.

Within Dortmund Zoo, some stone lice are "tended" and "on display".

Petrascheck's handbook of Lagerstättenlehre (ores and mineral resources) refers to weathering effects of the animal.

Iris Ritzmann Lithophagus entry in Enzyklopädie Medizingeschichte claims a predecessor, the Steinbiter or Lithophagus, mentioned already in Zedlers Universallexikon. She states a 19th-century use of homeopathic remedies, based on Lapis infernalis C 30 had resulted in the extinction of the species.

According to a scientific paper of Deutsche Bibliothek, a rough guess of the amount of stone lice in the neighborhood of German libraries amounted to 113.3 billion. The author, Dr. Florian Seiffert, assumes that after the fall of the Berlin Wall, stone lice sought another ecological niche and found it in libraries. The Berlin wall case has been confirmed as well in English sources.

The German Insurance Catalogue for the German Public Health Service (only the G-DRG Version 2003/2004) temporarily mentioned Stonelouse Parasitism on men as a possible illness and gave some indications about average treatment, cost tags and remedies. The Color Atlas of Pathology by Thieme Medical Publishers refers to Petrophaga lorioti as a therapeutic infestation that could be used in the management of stone disorders.

The municipality of Zürich has issued official guidance for citizens having trouble with stone lice.
