= Pschyrembel Klinisches Wörterbuch =

Pschyrembel most commonly refers to a popular medical dictionary in German, the Pschyrembel Clinical Dictionary (Pschyrembel Klinisches Wörterbuch).

== Pschyrembel Clinical Dictionary ==
The Pschyrembel Clinical Dictionary alphabetically lists and explains all common/important medical words.

Historically, the predecessor of this work was the Wörterbuch der klinischen Kunstausdrücke, by Otto Dornblüth, M.D., published in 1894 by Veit & Comp. publishers, Leipzig, Germany. This publisher later merged with four other publishers to become Walter de Gruyter publishers, Berlin, Germany (often abbreviated to de Gruyter).

This preceding work was thoroughly revised by Willibald Pschyrembel, M.D. (1901–1987), a professor of medicine, in Berlin, Germany. Willibald Pschyrembel was the sole editor of this dictionary from 1931 until 1982.

The medical dictionary became very popular with physicians, medical personnel and medical students in the three German speaking countries. It simply became known as the Pschyrembel. De Gruyter has been publishing the Pschyrembel ever since. The current edition is the 269th edition, published in June 2023.

== A curiosity in the Pschyrembel Clinical Dictionary ==
The current edition – as well as many older editions – has the entry stone louse. The text in this entry is most serious. For example, the Latin name of this louse is specified as Petrophaga lorioti, and the mode of transmission is described. However, the stone louse is only a fictitious animal created by the German satirical comedian Loriot to parody nature documentaries, and included in the Pschyrembel as a copyright trap, because no genuine medical dictionary (by a different publisher) would include it unless it had been plagiarized.

This humorous entry has become so popular in Germany that many Germans who are not connected to medicine professionally still know of the existence of the Pschyrembel because of this entertaining entry.

== Pschyrembel line of products ==
From a commercial point of view, Pschyrembel not only refers to the popular Pschyrembel Clinical Dictionary, but is the trade name for a series medical reference works published by de Gruyter.

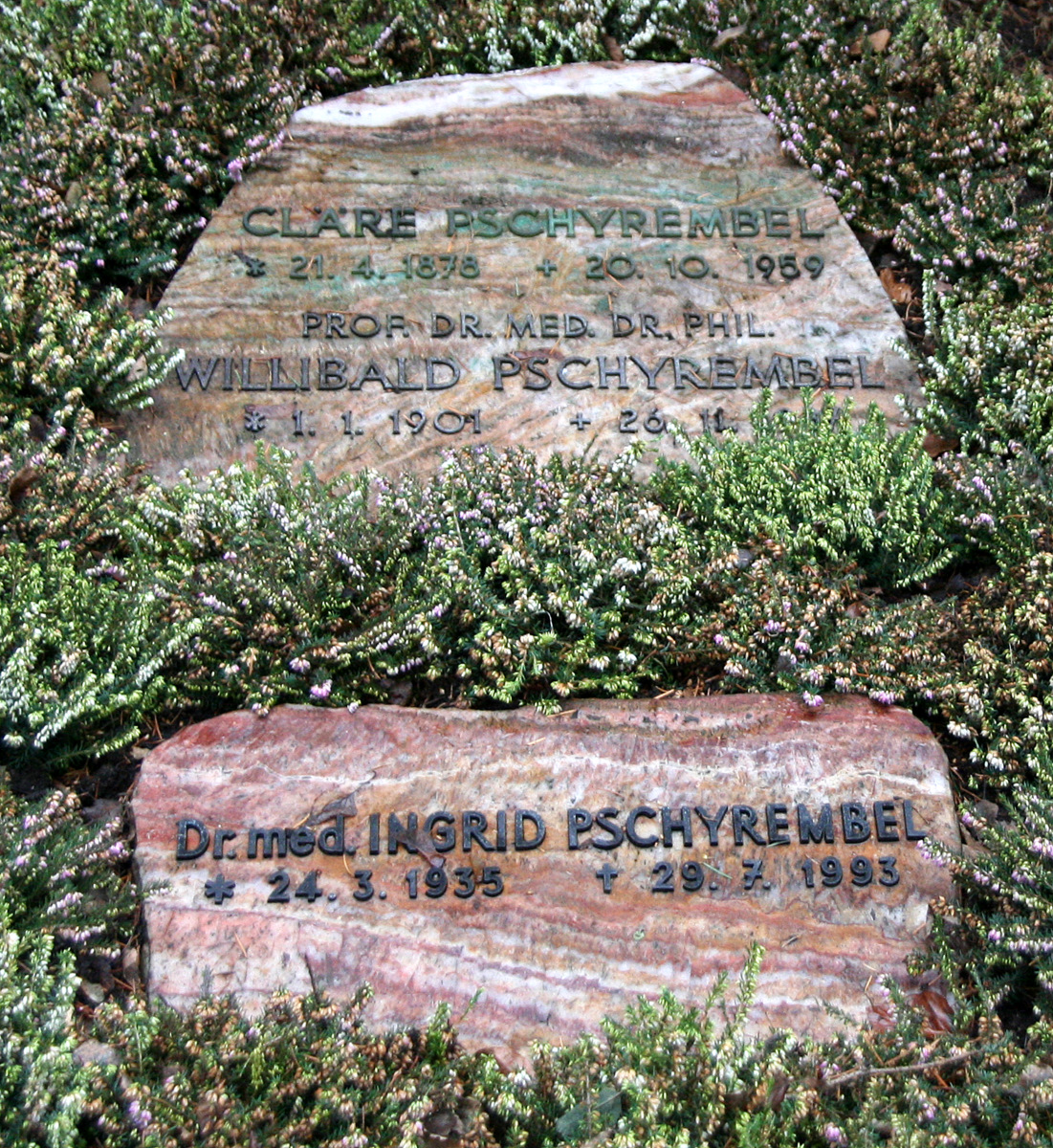
Grave of the founder Willibald Pschyrembel

On the one hand, there is not only the printed version of the dictionary, but also an online version, a PDA version, a pocket PC version and an Apple app version.

On the other hand, de Gruyter offers further products under the trade name Pschyrembel. These include, for example, a dictionary for nursing sciences and a dictionary for diabetelogy.
