= Zzxjoanw =

Fictitious encyclopedia entry

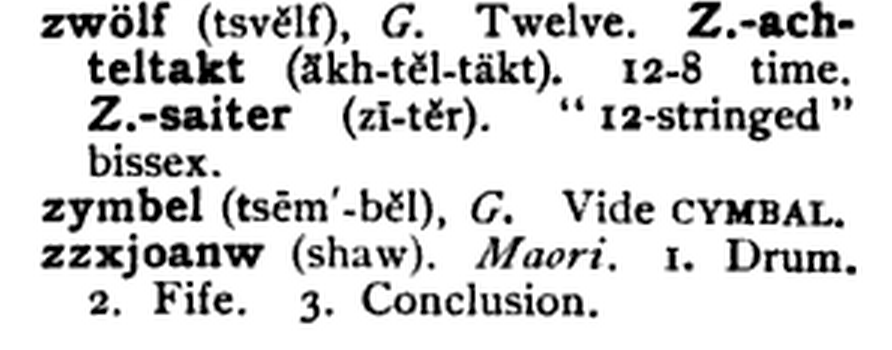
The original fictitious entry from 1903

Zzxjoanw (ostensibly pronounced /ʃɔː/ SHAW) is a fictitious entry in an encyclopedia which fooled logologists for many years. It referred to a purported Māori word meaning "drum", "fife", or "conclusion".

== Origin ==
In 1903, author Rupert Hughes published The Musical Guide, an encyclopedia of classical music. Among its many sections was a "pronouncing and defining dictionary of terms, instruments, etc." The dictionary, 252 pages in all, explained the meaning and gave the pronunciation of German, Italian, and other non-English words found in the terminology of classical music. At the end of the dictionary, immediately following the entry for zymbel (German for cymbal), Hughes added the following definition:

zzxjoanw (shaw). Maori. 1. Drum. 2. Fife. 3. Conclusion.

The entry was retained when the book was republished under different titles in 1912 and 1939.

== Analysis and discovery as likely hoax ==
Zzxjoanw attracted interest from logologists who wrote about it with a mixture of intrigue and skepticism. Helene and Charlton Laird included it in their 1957 book The Tree of Language, noting that "perhaps Mr. Hughes is having his little joke, since the word doesn't appear in any other dictionary we've consulted". Dmitri Borgmann included the term in his 1965 book, Language on Vacation: An Olio of Orthographical Oddities:

The Music Lovers' Encyclopedia, compiled by Rupert Hughes, revised by Deems Taylor and Russell Kerr, and published in 1954, presents us with one of the most unbelievable, one of the most intriguing letter combinations ever to claim recognition as a word: ZZXJOANW. This spectacular word is so versatile that it possesses not merely one, but three different meanings: (a) drum; (b) fife; (c) conclusion. The term is of Maori origin.

In 1974, Mrs. Byrne's Dictionary of Unusual, Obscure, and Preposterous Words, while accepting the word's meaning as a "Māori drum", rejected Hughes' pronunciation of "shaw", proposing a somewhat different version: "ziks-jo'an".

Philip M. Cohen first published about zzxjoanw as a potential hoax in a 1976 issue of Word Ways. He highlighted its pronunciation, its unlikely connection to the spelling, its wide variety of meanings, and that one of those meanings, "conclusion", also happened to conclude the reference work in which it appeared. He also pointed to its unlikely Māori origin, because "Maori has no closed syllables or consonant clusters, let alone the conglomerations of 'zzxjoanw', nor even an 's' or 'sh' sound. The available Maori dictionaries give words for 'drum' and 'end', but they haven't the slightest resemblance to 'zzxjoanw' or 'shaw'". Ross Eckler picked up Cohen's critique in his 1996 book Making the Alphabet Dance, speculating that Hughes may have "expected it to be obvious, but he did not take into account the credulity of logologists, sensitized by dictionary-sanctioned outlandish words such as mleccha and qaraqalpaq."

The book You Say Tomato: An Amusing and Irreverent Guide to the Most Often Mispronounced Words in the English Language, published in 2005, citing "eminent alternative lexicographer Mr. Peter Bowler", gave the meaning as a Māori drum; however, it declined to offer a pronunciation, saying that "We'll leave the pronunciation to the Maoris, although Welshmen and Poles are said to be able to do wonders with it".

== See also ==
- Taonga pūoro, for actual musical instruments used by Māori people, including percussion instruments

== Bibliography ==
- Hughes, Rupert (1903). The Musical Guide. New York: McClure, Phillips & Co. OCLC 861137.
- Hughes, Rupert (1912). Music Lovers' Cyclopedia. Garden City, NY: Doubleday, Doran & Co. OCLC 1315690.
- Hughes, Rupert; Deems Taylor; Russell Kerr (1939). Music Lovers' Encyclopedia. Garden City, NY: Garden City Publishing Co. OCLC 163469059.
