= Beatosu and Goblu =

Fictional towns

- Beatosu (left arrow) and Goblu (right arrow)
- Created by: Peter Fletcher

In-universe information
- Type: City
- Locations: Ohio

Beatosu and Goblu are two non-existent towns in Fulton and Lucas counties, respectively, in the US state of Ohio. They were inserted into the 1978–1979 edition of the official state of Michigan map. The names refer to the slogan of University of Michigan fans ("Go Blue!") and a reference to their archrivals from Ohio State University ("Beat OSU").

== History ==
Peter Fletcher, a Michigan alumnus and chairman of the State Highway Commission with a "sly sense of humor", ordered the inclusion of the fake towns of "Goblu" (near the real town of Bono, Ohio, off State Route 2) and "Beatosu" (near Archbold, Ohio, just south of Interstate 80/Interstate 90/Ohio Turnpike at exit 25). On the printed map, the fictitious town names appear in all lowercase letters ("goblu" and "beatosu"), while every other town name is capitalized. As well, while all real locations are clearly marked, there is no specific dot, boundary line or other marker to identify the precise location of the two fictitious towns.

In a 2008 interview, Fletcher explained that a fellow Michigan alumnus had been teasing him about the Mackinac Bridge colors: green and white, the colors of Michigan State University. Fletcher noted that the bridge colors were in compliance with federal highway regulations, so he had no choice in that matter; he did, however, have more control over the state highway map. Fletcher said that he thus ordered a cartographer to insert the two fictitious towns.

In their 2012 obituary of Fletcher, AnnArbor.com noted that the maps containing the fictional cities had a limited print run and have become collector's items. The map's publication has also been noted as a good luck charm for the University of Michigan Wolverines that year; the team beat their arch rivals 14–3 in the 1978 edition of The Game, which was once called the greatest North American sports rivalry by a writer for ESPN.com. The map and the rivalry were included in Britannica's "One Good Fact" entry for March 11, 2025.

== In popular culture ==
The fictional G.I. Joe comic book character Road Pig is recorded as having been born in Goblu, Michigan.

The movie Paper Towns refers to the concept of paper towns. In their description, it refers to fake towns on a map created by cartographers to deter copyright infringement. A map extent of Beatosu is shown as an example.

== See also ==
- Phantom settlement
- Fictitious entry
- Trap street
- Argleton
