= Lexicographic error =

Errors made in dictionaries

A lexicographic error is an inaccurate entry in a dictionary. Such problems, because they undercut the intention of providing authoritative guidance to readers and writers, attract special attention.

== History ==
Although dictionaries are often expected to be flawless, most lexicographers and people who frequently use dictionaries are keenly aware that all dictionaries contain errors. The preparation of dictionaries requires immense time, expertise and concentration, and there are never sufficient human and financial resources available to ensure complete accuracy. In the words of Johnson himself, "Dictionaries are like watches, the worst is better than none, and the best cannot be expected to go quite true."

== Examples ==
An early English-language example was the definition of pastern as "the knee of a horse" in Dr. Johnson's famed 18th-century Dictionary of the English Language. That would suit the word fetlock, but the pastern is in fact a long portion of the leg immediately below the fetlock. When a woman asked him why he had made the error, Johnson, according to Boswell, replied, "Ignorance, Madam, pure ignorance."

In the 1930s, Webster's New International Dictionary, Second Edition accidentally documented, for four years, a supposed word "dord", whose only basis was a clerical error by the publisher.

The first edition (1987) of the Collins COBUILD English Language Dictionary contained an entry for a verb hink, which it said was conjugated hinks, hinking, hinked and which it defined as follows: "If you hink, you think hopefully and unrealistically about something." The entry is a ghost word included by the editors to trap plagiarists. The wording is the result of an in-house joke. However, some reviewers took it seriously, speculating for example that it is "clearly an error for 'think'." The word was removed from later editions.

In the early 21st century, the online and CD-ROM editions of the Macmillan English Dictionary gave two different spoken readings of the headword for the entry "George, St. – the PATRON SAINT of England": the American reading was the correct "Saint George," but the British reading was "George Street." Presumably the British narrator had been given a list of words to read and the comma after "George" was either missing or overlooked.
