= Apopudobalia =

Fictional sport

Apopudobalia (Ancient Greek: ἀποπουδοβαλία; ἀπο- + ποδός + ball + -ία) is a fictional sport that was the subject of a famous fictitious entry by the German ancient historian Mischa Meier in Der neue Pauly Enzyklopaedie der Antike, edited by H. Cancik and H. Schneider, vol. 1 (Stuttgart, 1996, ISBN 3-476-01470-3), which gives a description of an ancient Greco-Roman sport that anticipates modern soccer. The article goes on to cite suitably sparse documentation for the nonexistent sport (this includes a Festschrift to one M. Sammer), and to assert that a Roman form of the game enjoyed a certain popularity amongst the Roman legions, and consequently spread throughout the Empire as far afield as Britain, "where the game enjoyed a revival in the 19th century." It also notes that the game was frowned upon by some early Christian writers, such as Tertullian.

In reality, the ancient Romans did play a game resembling rugby called harpastum.
