= Agloe, New York =

Fictional place in New York state, USA

Coordinates: 41°57′57″N 74°54′22″W

Agloe
- A General Drafting map location
- Fictional Agloe, New York, a copyright trap, shown on a real map of New York published by Exxon in 1998.
- First appearance: 1925; 101 years ago
- Created by: Otto G. Lindberg and Ernest Alpers
- Genre: Map

In-universe information
- Type: Copyright trap
- Locations: Agloe General Store (formerly)
- State: New York
- County: Delaware County, New York
- Town: Colchester, New York

Agloe was a fictional hamlet in Colchester, Delaware County, New York, United States. Mapmakers fabricated the community as a phantom settlement, an example of a fictitious entry added to a map to catch plagiarism. Years later, a nearby fishing lodge was renamed Agloe Lodge, making Agloe a real landmark.

Agloe is also known for its role in the American romantic mystery novel Paper Towns by John Green and its film adaptation.

== History ==
In the 1920s, General Drafting founder Otto G. Lindberg and an assistant, Ernest Alpers, assigned an anagram of their initials to a dirt-road intersection in the Catskill Mountains: NY 206 and Morton Hill Road, north of Roscoe, New York. The town was designed as a "copyright trap" to enable the publishers to detect others copying their maps. Agloe appeared on maps made by General Drafting for Esso.

In 1930, a business named Agloe Lodge Farms was incorporated, which acquired a fishing lodge in the area and renamed it Agloe Lodge. Members of the Nead family, which sold the land to Agloe Lodge Farms, told the Times Herald-Record in 2016 that the land had been sold for $1, and that they suspected the company was actually a front for Rand McNally.

According to cartographer Frank Brown, the town later appeared on a map produced by Rand McNally. When General Drafting approached Rand McNally about the violation of their copyright, Rand McNally representatives said that the information about the town had come from Delaware County records, which showed that a business with the name Agloe existed there. When recounting this story to the Road Map Collectors' Association in 2002, Brown said that the business was a general store. Longtime residents of the area have said that there was never a general store at the site although there was a fishing lodge renamed Agloe Lodge.

Agloe itself continued to appear on maps as recently as the 1990s, but has now been deleted. It briefly appeared on Google Maps. The United States Geological Survey added "Agloe (Not Official)" to the Geographic Names Information System database on February 25, 2014.

== In popular culture ==
Agloe is featured in the 2008 novel Paper Towns by John Green and its 2015 film adaptation. During the film and in the novel, one of the main characters, Margo, runs away from home, leaving personal clues to her friend and neighbor Quentin of where she has gone. He then discovers she is hiding in one of the US's most famous "paper towns": Agloe, New York. The book's name is based on the various ways that Quentin interprets the phrase "paper towns".

Agloe is also featured in the 2022 novel The Cartographers by Peng Shepherd. In the novel, the protagonist Nell Young investigates the death of her estranged father, a renowned cartographer, and uncovers a mysterious gas station map that contains the fictional town. The story reimagines Agloe as a place that can manifest in reality under the condition of a visitor possessing the map with Agloe included, and its existence becomes key to the novel’s plot.
