= Funistrada =

Fictional food item

Funistrada is a fictitious food item. The term was inserted in a U.S. Army survey of soldiers circa 1974 regarding their food preferences. Funistrada, along with a fake vegetable dish called "buttered ermal" and a fake meat dish called "braised trake", was inserted "to provide an estimate of how much someone will respond to a word which sounds like a food name or will answer without reading."

Funistrada scored higher in popularity than eggplant, lima beans, and cranberry juice. All three fake items, however, had the highest percentage of "never tried" responses.

== Appearances ==
- Bill Bryson cited the food in his 1990 book Mother Tongue as an example of a word that is made up for a specific purpose.
- It appears in CHOW: A Cook's Tour of Military Food by Paul Dickson.
- A restaurant in Northern Michigan has used the name Trattoria Funistrada since 2000.
- A Breeders' Cup horse took the name in 1985.

== See also ==
- Fictitious entry – Deliberately incorrect entry in a reference work
- Lizardman's constant
