= Phantom settlement =

Settlement on a map that does not exist

Phantom settlements, or paper towns, are settlements that appear on maps but do not actually exist. They are either accidents or copyright traps. Notable examples in the English-speaking world include Argleton, Lancashire in England, and Beatosu and Goblu, Ohio in the United States.

Phantom settlements often result from copyright traps, also known as Mountweazels, which are false entries placed in literature to catch illegal copiers. Agloe, New York, was invented on a 1930s map as a copyright trap. In 1950, a general store was built there and named Agloe General Store, as that was the name seen on the map. Thus, the phantom settlement became a real one.

There are also misnamed settlements, such as the villages of Mawdesky and Dummy 1325 in Lancashire on Google Maps.

There is a satirical conspiracy theory that the German city of Bielefeld is a phantom settlement, despite its population of over 300,000. Another example is Leiria, Portugal, (pop. 128,640), which even gave rise to the song "Leiria não existe". In the same spirit, around 2015 a meme started circulating in Italy about the alleged non-existence of one of its regions, Molise (which some jokingly called Molisn't, a portmanteau between the name of the region and the English isn't).

== See also ==
- Paper Towns, a novel where phantom settlements become plot points
  - The 2015 film of the same name, based on the novel
- Fictitious entry – Deliberately incorrect entry in a reference work
- Ghost town – Abandoned settlement with intact features
- Lost city – Human settlement that has become uninhabited and largely forgotten by history
- Paper township – Type of civil township in Ohio
- Phantom island – Island recorded on maps but proven nonexistent
- Trap street – Fictitious street on a map
- Ghost stations – stations which trains do not stop for; urban legends about ghost stations include the Kisaragi Station and The Silver Train of Stockholm
- Llandegley International Airport – Welsh hoax airport signage
