= Trap street =

Fictitious street on a map

In cartography, a trap street is a fictitious entry in the form of a misrepresented street on a map, often outside the area the map nominally covers, for the purpose of "trapping" plagiarists of the map who, if caught, would be unable to explain the inclusion of the "trap street" on their map as innocent. On maps that are not of streets, other "trap" features (such as nonexistent towns, or mountains with the wrong elevations) may be inserted or altered for the same purpose.

Trap streets are often nonexistent streets, but sometimes, rather than actually depicting a street where none exists, a map will misrepresent the nature of a street in a fashion that can still be used to detect copyright violators but is less likely to interfere with navigation. For instance, a map might add nonexistent bends to a street, or depict a major street as a narrow lane, without changing its location or its connections to other streets, or the trap street might be placed in an obscure location of a map that is unlikely to be referenced.

Trap streets are rarely acknowledged by publishers. One exception is a popular driver's atlas for the city of Athens, Greece, which has a warning inside its front cover that potential copyright violators should beware of trap streets.

== Legal issues ==
=== In the United States ===
In Nester's Map & Guide Corp. v. Hagstrom Map Co. (1992), the United States District Court for the Eastern District of New York held that trap streets are not copyrightable under the federal law of the United States. The court stated:

To treat "false" facts interspersed among actual facts and represented as actual facts as fiction would mean that no one could ever reproduce or copy actual facts without risk of reproducing a false fact and thereby violating a copyright ... If such were the law, information could never be reproduced or widely disseminated."

=== In the United Kingdom ===
In a 2001 case, The Automobile Association in the United Kingdom agreed to settle a case for £20,000,000 when it was caught copying Ordnance Survey maps. In this case, the identifying "fingerprints" were not deliberate errors but rather stylistic features such as the width of roads.

=== In Singapore ===
In another case, the Singapore Land Authority sued Virtual Map, an online publisher of maps, for infringing on its copyright. The Singapore Land Authority stated in its case that there were deliberate errors in maps they had provided to Virtual Map years earlier. Virtual Map denied this and insisted that it had done its own cartography.

== Cultural references ==
The 1979 science fiction novel The Ultimate Enemy by Fred Saberhagen includes the short story "The Annihilation of Angkor Apeiron" in which a salesman allows a draft of a new Encyclopedia Galactica to be captured by alien war machines. It leads them to believe there is a nearby planet ripe for attack, but the planet is actually a copyright trap and the aliens are led away from inhabited worlds, saving millions of lives.

The 2010 novel Kraken by China Miéville features the trap streets of the London A–Z being places where the magical denizens of the city can exist without risk of being disturbed by normal folk.

A 2013 film, Trap Street, inverts the usual meaning of a trap street, becoming a real street which is deliberately obscured or removed from a map—and anyone who attempts to identify it by placing it on public record is then "trapped".

The 2015 Doctor Who episode "Face the Raven" features a hidden street where alien asylum seekers have taken shelter. Due to a psychic field that subconsciously makes observers ignore it, outsiders consider it a trap street when they see it on maps. One scene involves the character Clara Oswald discussing the definition of "trap street". The episode's working title was also "Trap Street".

== See also ==
- Agloe, New York – Fictional place in New York state, USA
- Argleton – Phantom settlement in England on Google Maps
- Beatosu and Goblu, Ohio – Fictional towns
- Fictitious entry – Deliberately incorrect entry in a reference work
- Ghost town – Abandoned settlement with intact features
- Honeytoken – Entries in a database to track stolen data
- Paper street – Non-existent street on maps or plans
- Phantom settlement – Settlement on a map that does not exist
- Phantom island – Island recorded on maps but proven nonexistent
- Watermark – Identification on paper to prevent counterfeiting
