= Pauly encyclopedias =

Pauly's encyclopedia and derived works

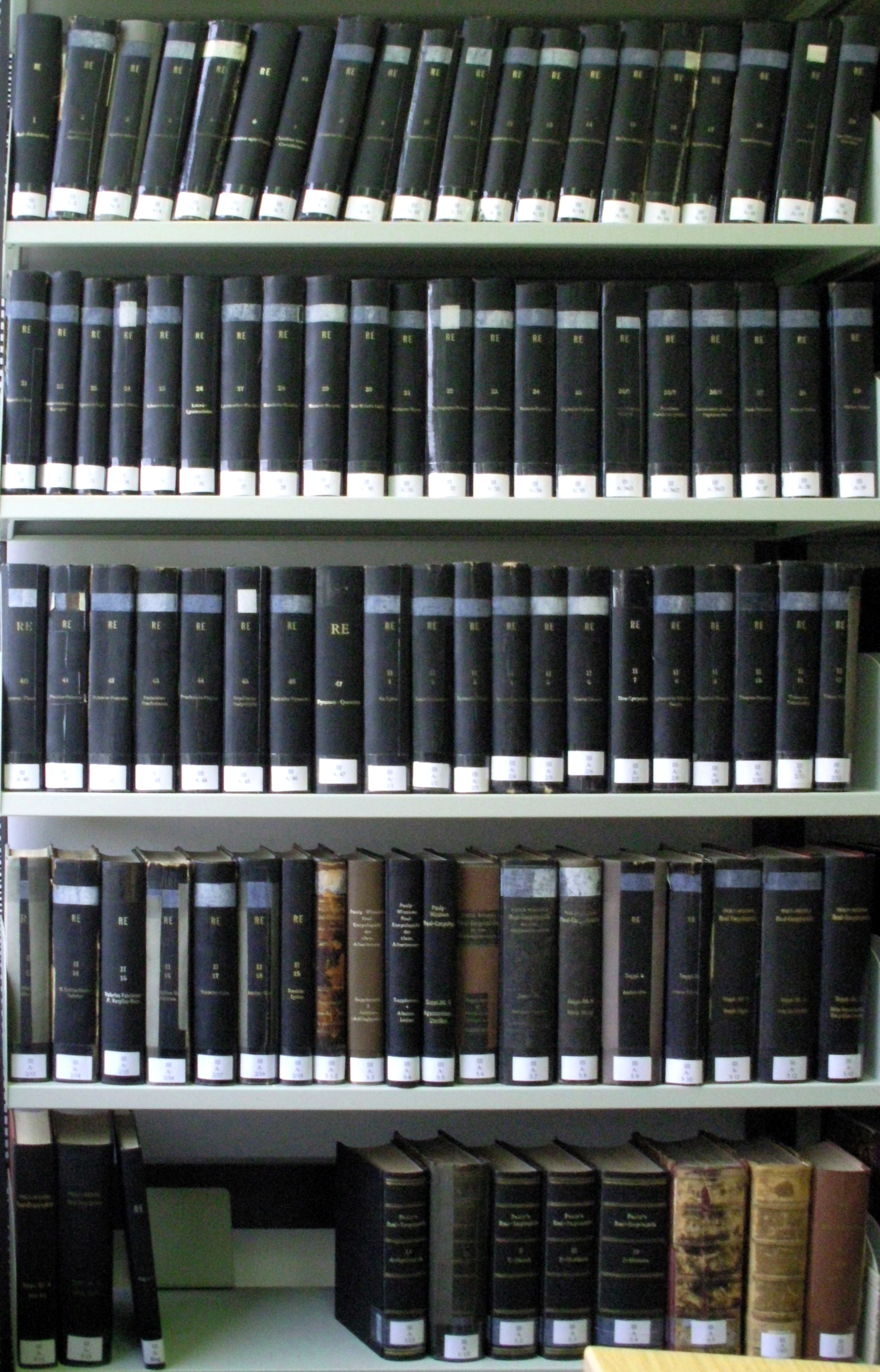
The 8 volumes of the revised version of Pauly's initial Real-Encyclopädie are at the lower right. The 83 volumes of Wissowa's revised RE fill the entire rest of this bookcase in the library of the University of Göttingen's Seminar for Classical Philology.

The Pauly encyclopedias or the Pauly-Wissowa family of encyclopedias, are a set of related German-language encyclopedias on Greco-Roman topics and scholarship. The first of these, Pauly's Real-Encyclopädie der Classischen Alterthumswissenschaft in Alphabetischer Ordnung or Ur-Pauly (1839–1852), was begun by German compiler August Pauly. Other encyclopedias in the set include Pauly–Wissowa (1890–1978), Little Pauly (1964–1975), and The New Pauly (1996–2012).

== Ur-Pauly ==
The first edition was the Real-Encyclopädie der Classischen Alterthumswissenschaft in Alphabetischer Ordnung, ("Practical Encyclopedia of the Study of Classical Ancient History in Alphabetical Order"), originally compiled by August Friedrich Pauly. As the basis for the subsequent Pauly–Wissowa edition, it is also known as the Ur-Pauly. The first volume was published in 1839 but Pauly died in 1845 before the last was completed. Christian Waltz (1802–1857) and Wilhelm Siegmund Teuffel completed the 6 volume first edition in 1852.

A second edition of the first volume of Pauly's encyclopedia was published by Teuffel in 1861. The revised second volume came out in 1866, with the rest of the work left incomplete.

== Pauly–Wissowa ==
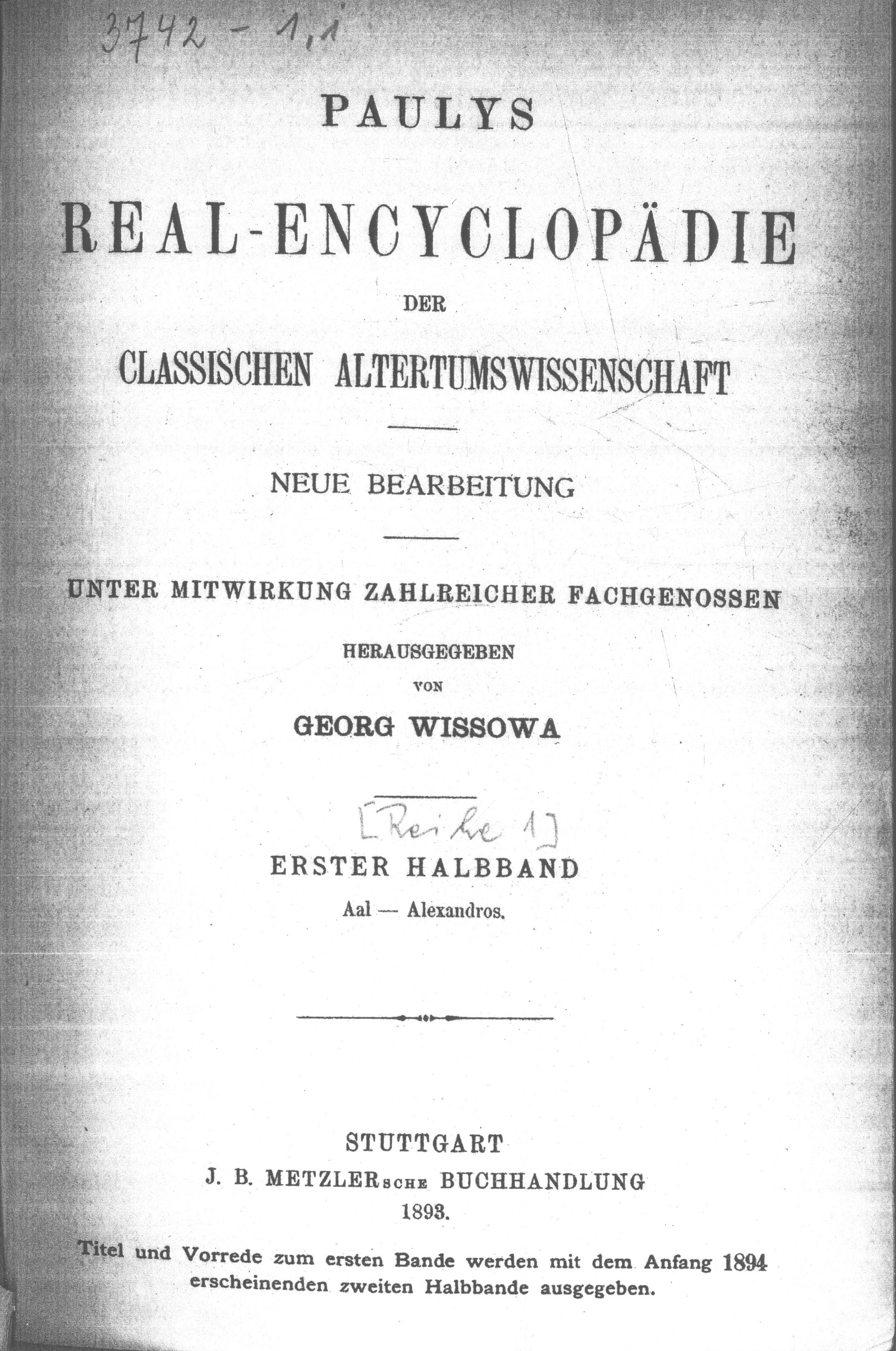
The first page of the first half-volume (halbband) of the Pauly–Wissowa

Georg Wissowa began work on a new and more ambitious edition in 1890. Paulys Real-Encyclopädie der Classischen Altertumswissenschaft ("Pauly's Practical Encyclopedia of the Study of Classical Ancient History"), commonly abbreviated as RE, was planned for completion by 1900 but work again outlasted its initial editor. Continued under Wilhelm Kroll, Kurt Witte, Karl Mittelhaus, and Konrat Ziegler, the series was not completed until 1972, with supplements added until 1978 and the index in 1980. Each article was written by a recognized specialist in the relevant field, but unsurprisingly for a work spanning three generations, the underlying assumptions vary radically with the age of the article. Many early biographies were written by Elimar Klebs, Paul von Rohden, Friedrich Münzer, and Otto Seeck.

First Series, A–Q

- Band I, Halbbände 1–2, Aal–Apollokrates (1894)
- Band II, Halbband 3, Apollon–Artemis (1895)
- Band II, Halbband 4, Artemisia–Barbaroi (1896)
- Band III, Halbband 5, Barbarus–Campanus (1897)
- Band III, Halbband 6, Campanus ager–Claudius (1899)
- Band IV, Halbband 7, Claudius mons–Cornificius (1900)
- Band IV, Halbband 8, Corniscae–Demodoros (1901)
- Band V, Halbbände 9–10, Demogenes–Ephoroi (1905)
- Band VI, Halbband 11, Ephoros–Eutychos (1907)
- Band VI, Halbband 12, Euxantios–Fornaces (1909)
- Band VII, Halbband 13, Fornax–Glykon (1910)
- Band VII, Halbband 14, Glykyrrhiza–Helikeia (1912)
- Band VIII, Halbband 15, Helikon–Hestia (1912)
- Band VIII, Halbband 16, Hestiaia–Hyagnis (1913)
- Band IX, Halbband 17, Hyaia–Imperator (1914)
- Band IX, Halbband 18, Imperium–Iugum (1916)
- Band X, Halbband 19, Iugurtha–Ius Latii (1918)
- Band X, Halbband 20, Ius Liberorum–Katochos (1919)
- Band XI, Halbband 21, Katoikoi–Komödie (1921)
- Band XI, Halbband 22, Komogrammateus–Kynegoi + Register of I–X & Suppl. I–III (1922)
- Band XII, Halbband 23, Kynesioi–Legio (1924)
- Band XII, Halbband 24, Legio–Libanon (1925)
- Band XIII, Halbband 25, Libanos–Lokris (1926)
- Band XIII, Halbband 26, Lokroi–Lysimachides (1927)
- Band XIV, Halbband 27, Lysimachos–Mantike (1928)
- Band XIV, Halbband 28, Mantikles–Mazaion (1930)
- Band XV, Halbband 29, Mazaios–Mesyros (1931)
- Band XV, Halbband 30, Met–Molaris lapis + Register of I–XV, IA–IVA & Suppl. I–V (1932)
- Band XVI, Halbband 31, Molatzes–Myssi (1933)
- Band XVI, Halbband 32, Mystagogos–Nereae (1935)
- Band XVII, Halbband 33, Nereiden–Numantia (1936)
- Band XVII, Halbband 34, Numen–Olympia (1937)
- Band XVIII, Halbband 35, Olympia–Orpheus (1939)
- Band XVIII, Halbband 36.1, Orphische Dichtung–Palatini (1942)
- Band XVIII, Halbband 36.2, Palatinus–Paranatellonta (1949)
- Band XVIII, Halbband 36.3, Paranomon graphe–Pax (1949)
- Band XIX, Halbband 37, Pech–Petronius (1937)
- Band XIX, Halbband 38, Petros–Philon (1938)
- Band XX, Halbband 39, Philon–Pignus (1941)
- Band XX, Halbband 40, Pigranes–Plautinus (1950)
- Band XXI, Halbband 41, Plautius–Polemokrates (1951)
- Band XXI, Halbband 42, Polemon–Pontanene (1952)
- Band XXII, Halbband 43, Pontarches–Praefectianus (1953)
- Band XXII, Halbband 44, Praefectura–Priscianus (1954)
- Band XXIII, Halbband 45, Priscilla–Psalychiadai (1957)
- Band XXIII, Halbband 46, Psamathe–Pyramiden + Register of I–XXIII, IA–VIIIA & Suppl. I–VIII (1959)
- Band XXIV, Halbband 47, Pyramos–Quosenus (1963)

Second Series, R–Z

- Band IA, Halbband 1, Ra–Ryton (1914)
- Band IA, Halbband 2, Saale–Sarmathon (1920)
- Band IIA, Halbband 3, Sarmatia–Selinos (1921)
- Band IIA, Halbband 4, Selinuntia–Sila (1923)
- Band IIIA, Halbband 5, Silacenis–Sparsus (1927)
- Band IIIA, Halbband 6, Sparta–Stluppi (1929)
- Band IVA, Halbband 7, Stoa–Symposion (1931)
- Band IVA, Halbband 8, Symposion–Tauris (1932)
- Band VA, Halbband 9, Taurisci–Thapsis (1934)
- Band VA, Halbband 10, Thapsos–Thesara (1934)
- Band VIA, Halbband 11, Thesauros–Timomachos (1936)
- Band VIA, Halbband 12, Timon–Tribus (1937)
- Band VIIA, Halbband 13, Tributum–M. Tullius Cicero (1939)
- Band VIIA, Halbband 14, M. Tullius Cicero–Valerius (1948)
- Band VIIIA, Halbband 15, Valerius Fabrianus–P. Vergilius Maro (1955)
- Band VIIIA, Halbband 16, P. Vergilius Maro–Vindeleia (1958)
- Band IXA, Halbband 17, Vindelici–Vulca (1961)
- Band IXA, Halbband 18, Vulcanius–Zenius (1967)
- Band XA, Halbband 19, Zenobia–Zythos (1972)

Supplements

- Supplementband I, Aba–Demokratia (1903)
- Supplementband II, Herodes–Herodotos (1913)
- Supplementband III, Aachen–ad Iuglandem (1918)
- Supplementband IV, Abacus–Ledon + Delphoi (1924)
- Supplementband V, Agamemnon–Statilius (1931)
- Supplementband VI, Abretten–Thunudromon (1935)
- Supplementband VII, Adobogiona–Triakadieis (1940)
- Supplementband VIII, Achaios–Valerius (1956)
- Supplementband IX, Acilius–Utis (1962)
- Supplementband X, Accaus–Uttiedius (1965)
- Supplementband XI, Abragila–Zengisa (1968)
- Supplementband XII, Abdigildus–Thukydides (1970)
- Supplementband XIII, Africa Proconsularis–Viae publicae Romanae (1973)
- Supplementband XIV, Aelius–Zone (1974)
- Supplementband XV, Acilius–Zoilos (1978)

== Little Pauly ==
The size and price of Wissowa's edition being daunting, Konrat Ziegler put out an abridged Der Kleine Pauly ('The Little Pauly'; abbreviated as KlP or KlPauly) edition of 5 volumes between 1964 and 1975. Ziegler was assisted by Walther Sontheimer and Hans Gärtner.

== New Pauly ==
Der Neue Pauly ('The New Pauly'), abbreviated as DNP in the commonly-used Oxford Classical Dictionary scheme, was published in 16 volumes from 1996 to 2003, including 12 volumes on antiquity edited primarily by Hubert Cancik and Helmuth Schneider, 3 volumes on the classical tradition edited primarily by Manfred Landfester, and an index.

The English translation was published as Brill's New Pauly: Encyclopaedia of the Ancient World, abbreviated as BNP in the commonly-used Oxford Classical Dictionary scheme, in 22 volumes between 2002 and 2014. Supplements have been published regularly since 2004 in German and English translation. Among other numbering differences, there is one less supplement in the English edition than the German edition because in the German edition the index to the "Classical Tradition" was counted as a supplement.

== See also ==
- "Apopudobalia", a famous fictitious entry from the RE
- Oxford Classical Dictionary
- William Smith's A Dictionary of Greek and Roman Antiquities
- Daremberg & Saglio's Dictionnaire des Antiquités Grecques et Romaines
- Hofmann's Lexicon Universale
