= Paper Towns (novel) =

2008 novel by John Green

- The primary first edition cover
- Author: John Green
- Language: English
- Genre: Young adult, Mystery
- Publisher: Dutton Books
- Publication date: October 16, 2008
- Publication place: United States
- Media type: Print (Hardback, Paperback)
- Pages: 305
- ISBN: 978-0-525-47818-8
- OCLC: 202483793
- LC Class: PZ7.G8233 Pap 2008

Paper Towns is a novel written by John Green, published on October 16, 2008, by Dutton Books. The novel is about the coming-of-age of the protagonist, Quentin "Q" Jacobsen and his search for Margo Roth Spiegelman, his neighbor and childhood crush. During his search, Quentin and his friends Ben, Radar, and Lacey discover information about Margo.

John Green drew inspiration for this book from his experience and knowledge of "paper towns" during a road journey through South Dakota. It debuted at number five on the New York Times bestseller list for children's books and was awarded the 2009 Edgar Award for best young adult novel. A film adaptation was released on July 24, 2015.

== Plot summary ==
The two first edition alternate covers.

Paper Towns mostly takes place in and around Jefferson Park, a fictional subdivision located in suburban Orlando, Florida, and focuses on narrator and protagonist Quentin "Q" Jacobsen and his neighbor Margo Roth Spiegelman, with whom Quentin has always had a romantic fascination. As preadolescents, Quentin and Margo together discovered the corpse of a local man who died of suicide in their neighborhood park.

Nine years later, Quentin is an outcast whose best friends are Benjamin "Ben" Starling and Marcus "Radar" Lincoln, while Margo is a popular student—both now seniors at Winter Park High School. A month before their graduation, Margo suddenly reappears in Quentin's life, climbing through his bedroom window as she did during their first meeting.

She has devised an eleven-part plan of vengeance on a group of people she feels have hurt her during her time at high school; these people include her cheating boyfriend Jason "Jase" Worthington and peers Lacey Pemberton and Rebecca "Becca" Arrington. Margo needs an accomplice and a car to help her, and Quentin accepts. Margo and Quentin successfully complete the tasks, share a romantically ambiguous dance, and return to their homes around dawn.

The next day, Quentin wonders hopefully if Margo will start hanging out with him, but Margo is reported missing by her parents after three days. Quentin, Ben, and Radar soon discover a series of items that Margo has left hidden for Quentin: a picture of Woody Guthrie on Margo's bedroom window shade, Margo's highlighted copy of Walt Whitman's poem "Song of Myself", and a written address in Quentin's bedroom doorjamb.

Quentin and his friends follow these clues to find an abandoned mini-mall in Christmas, Florida, that contains evidence of Margo's recent presence. Quentin struggles to analyze all of Margo's clues and leftover materials in the mini-mall. He suspects the clues are meant to lead him to her current whereabouts, though he worries she may have committed suicide.

Based on a note Margo has left referring to "paper towns", Quentin realizes Margo may be hiding or buried in one of the many abandoned housing subdivisions—"pseudovisions" or "paper towns"—around Orlando. He drives to all of the pseudovisions where he feels that she may be hiding, but he cannot find her.

On the day of his graduation, Quentin comes across an obscure Internet post, with a comment left on it which Quentin recognizes as Margo's due to its distinctive capitalization, which tells him that Margo has been hiding in a fictitious town in New York State called Agloe (which was created as a copyright trap by mapmakers) and that she plans to leave Agloe immediately after noon on May 29. Quentin, Radar, Ben, and Lacey impulsively skip graduation to drive to Agloe to search for her, rushing to get from Florida to New York before noon on May 29.

In Agloe, they discover Margo is living in an old, dilapidated barn. She is shocked to see them, which angers the group, who expected her to be grateful for their presence. Margo had left those clues only to assure Quentin that she is okay, and did not want to be found.

Angry at her lack of gratitude, Radar, Ben, and Lacey leave and spend the night at a motel. Quentin realizes the image he had of Margo was as fake as the one that she had been projecting to everyone else and becomes furious at her for wasting his time. Margo argues that Quentin saved her for egotistical reasons: he wanted to be a knight in shining armor who saved the troubled girl.

Ultimately, Quentin accepts that it was unfair for him to expect Margo to live up to his perfect image of her, and he begins to logically overcome his sexual attraction towards her. After their conversation, Margo decides to go to New York City and asks Quentin to accompany her. Quentin wants to stay with her, and they kiss, but he understands that obligations in his life prevent him from going. Margo promises to Quentin that she will keep in contact with him.

== Characters ==
Quentin "Q" Jacobsen
The protagonist and narrator of the story. Quentin is the stereotypical rule-follower. He likes things to be neat and simple, making him the complete opposite of Margo Roth Spiegelman. Quentin has had a crush on Margo since they were kids, but the distance he kept from her created a perfect image of her in his head that turned out not to be real. His desire to find her after she goes missing drives the events of the story.
Margo Roth Spiegelman
A self-described "pretty girl" who runs away from home only to be pursued by her childhood friend. Spiegelman is assertive, is from a dysfunctional Jewish family, and is one of the most popular girls at her local high school. She has a love for American literature, music, and travel. Her pet dog, Myrna Mountweazel, is a reference to Lillian Virginia Mountweazel, a woman who never existed, but was listed in the 1975 edition of the New Columbia Encyclopedia.
Ben "Bloody Ben" Starling
One of Quentin and Radar's best friends, travels with them and his girlfriend, Lacey. He is in the school band. Ben is the comic relief of the book, providing a much needed humorous energy on the trip.
Marcus "Radar" Lincoln
He is one of Quentin's best friends. He was nicknamed by Quentin and Ben after the character from M*A*S*H. To his embarrassment, his parents own the world's largest collection of Black Santas. He is in the school band. He is also the brains of the group. He was very unwilling to follow along with much of the adventures they had, mainly because of his girlfriend, Angela, whom he was very loyal to.
Lacey Pemberton
Lacey is the best and closest friend of Margo. They were friends since kindergarten. She starts dating Ben after breaking up with Chuck Parson. Margo and Lacey have a strange friendship; Margo feels Lacey has always been judgmental of her throughout their relationship by sometimes saying, what Margo sees as, little insults to their difference in body type. After they reunite, Lacey is hurt that she worried so much and traveled all the way from Orlando, just to find that Margo did not even care that they had found her after looking for so long, thereby straining their friendship. They later reconciled after a phone conversation.

== Structure ==
The novel is written in three parts. Each individual part is named for a specific metaphor used considerably in that section. The titles of sections are "The Strings", "The Grass", and "The Vessel". Each individual chapter within the first two parts is labeled with a number. However, the third part of the novel is divided into smaller sections. Each section refers to the hour of the characters' road trip.

== Background ==
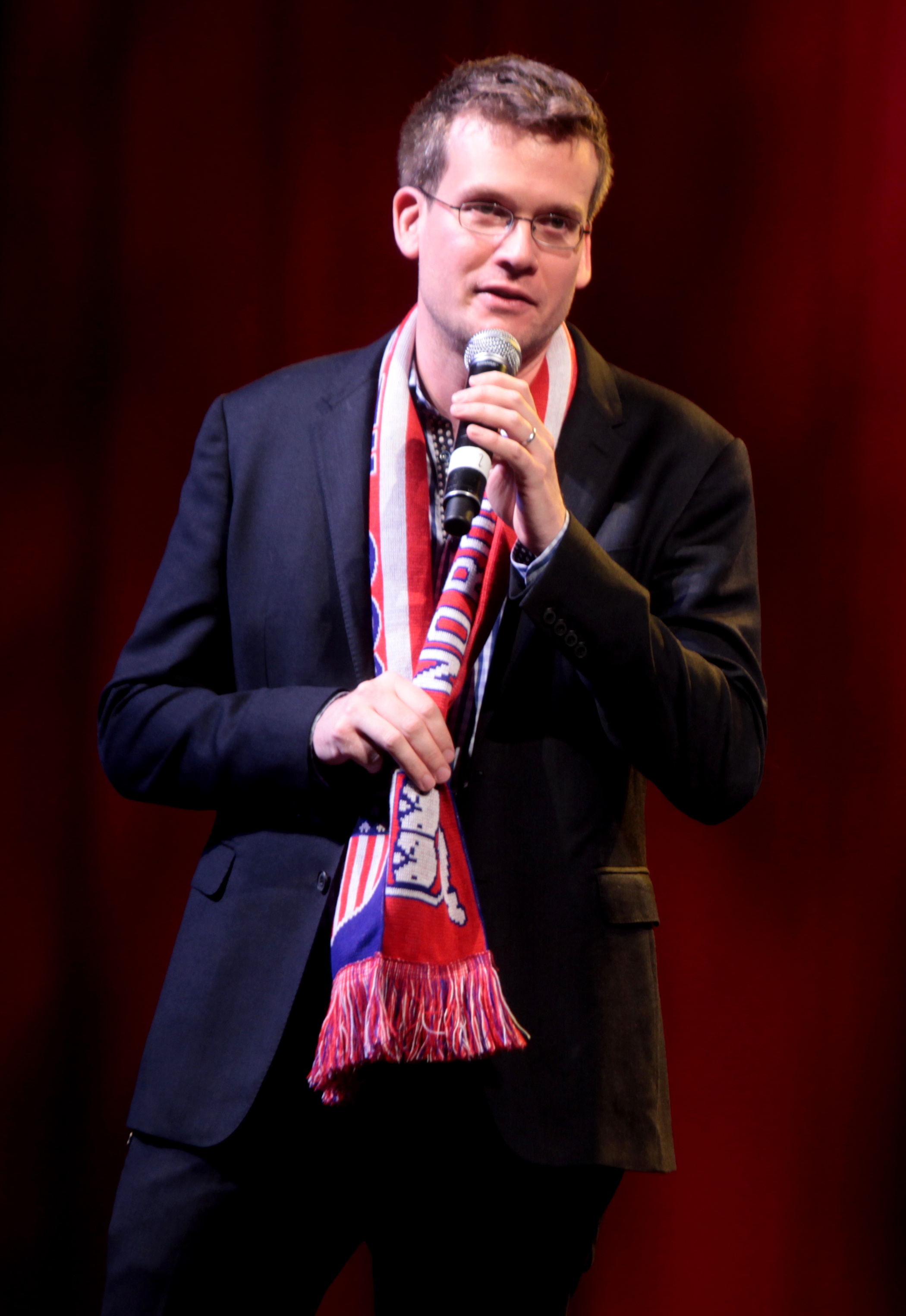
John Green, author of Paper Towns

Throughout the novel, the concept of paper towns is mentioned several times. As a former Orlando resident, John Green had seen and heard of many "paper towns". His first experience with a "paper town" occurred during his junior year of college while on a road trip. In South Dakota, he and his friend came across a paper town called Holen. At the end of the novel, John Green states that the story of Agloe presented in the text is mostly true: "Agloe began as a paper town created to protect against copyright infringement. But then people with these old Esso maps kept looking for it, and so someone built a store, making Agloe real."

== Reception ==
Paper Towns received mostly positive reviews. Publishers Weekly said: "The title, which refers to unbuilt subdivisions and copyright trap towns that appear on maps but don't exist, unintentionally underscores the novel's weakness: both milquetoast Q and self-absorbed Margo are types, not fully dimensional characters". It also said the novel is "another teen pleasing read". Kirkus Reviews praised the novel as "a winning combination". School Library Journal said: "Q is a great social outcast main character who sometimes thinks a little too much, but is completely relatable. Though we only really see Margo for the first third of the book, the clues really create her character and give us the feeling she's a complex person. Finding out who Margo is through the things she left behind was a really great way to develop her character."

Rebecca Swain of Orlando Sentinel stated: "Paper Towns has convinced me that jaded adult readers need to start raiding the Teen's section at the bookstore. Green, who grew up in Orlando and uses the city as a backdrop for the story, taps into the cadence of teenage life with sharp and funny writing, but transcends age with deeper insights." Chelsey G.H. Philpot, editorial assistant of The Horn Book Magazine, said: "the end breaks your heart, and yet it feels right". Rollie Welch called Paper Towns "Green's best work" up to that point. Michael Cart praised John Green for his symbolism and ability to synthesize imagination and reality; he wrote: "Green ponders the interconnectedness of imagination and perception, of mirrors and windows, of illusion and reality".

Robert Corwin of Arizona State University wrote, "some readers may find the author's use of language and sexual content objectionable." The Cleveland Plain Dealer stated, “Readers will find that the structure and central mystery of Paper Towns echo Green's debut, Looking for Alaska, and Gregory Galloway's 2005 novel, As Simple As Snow," and Kirkus Reviews wrote that Green's novel was “reminiscent" of Galloway's novel.

On June 23, 2014, Paper Towns was removed from the summer reading list for 13-year-olds at Dr John Long Middle School in Pasco County, Florida after a parent complained to a board member that she disapproved of the book's sexual content. The National Coalition Against Censorship responded to the removal by calling for the book to be reinstated to the reading list. In a letter to the district superintendent, the organization wrote: "No sound educational rationale for removing the book has been articulated, nor is it likely that one could be". Consequently, it was restored to the reading list the following month.

== Film adaptation ==
Fox 2000 developed the Paper Towns film with the same team that made The Fault in Our Stars. Jake Schreier directed the film. Nat Wolff, who played a role in the film version of The Fault in Our Stars, starred as Quentin, Cara Delevingne played Margo Roth Spiegelman, and Justice Smith, Austin Abrams, and Halston Sage played Quentin/Q's friends Radar, Ben, and Lacey, respectively. Jaz Sinclair appeared in the film as Angela, Radar's girlfriend. The film was released on July 24, 2015.

== Other editions ==
The paperback edition of the novel was released on September 22, 2009. The book was also released in the United Kingdom by Bloomsbury Publishing on May 3, 2010.

== Bibliography ==
- Green, John (2008). Paper Towns (Second ed.). New York City, New York: Penguin Group. ISBN 978-0-14-241493-4.
