= Peng Shepherd =

Chinese-American fantasy writer

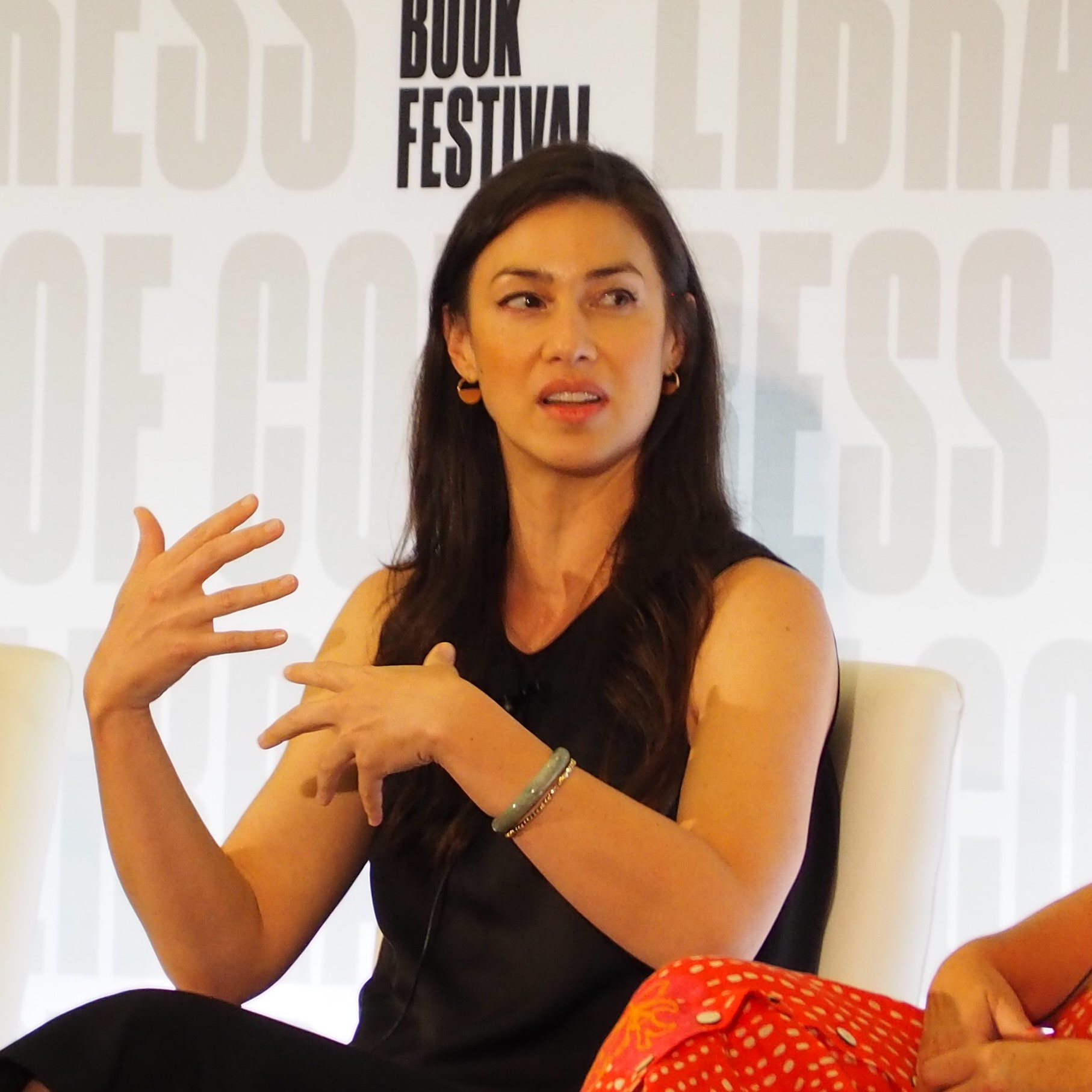
- Shepherd at the 2024 National Book Festival
- Born: May 12, 1986 (age 40); Phoenix, Arizona, U.S.
- Education: Arizona State University (BA); SOAS University of London (MA); New York University (MFA)
- Occupation: Writer
- Writing career
- Language: English
- Years active: 2016–present
- Genre: Fantasy
- Notable awards: National Endowment for the Arts Fellowship (2020); Neukom Institute for Computational Science Award (2019)
- Website: pengshepherd.com

Peng Shepherd (born May 12, 1986) is an American author. Her first novel, The Book of M, was released in 2018, followed by The Future Library in 2021 and The Cartographers in 2022. She is a National Endowment for the Arts Fellow.

== Early life and education ==
Peng Shepherd was born and raised in Phoenix, Arizona, a daughter of Lin Sue Cooney, a retired news anchor at Phoenix TV station KPNX. Peng earned a Bachelor of Arts in Chinese Language and Literature from Arizona State University in 2006. Peng then completed an MA in International Studies and Diplomacy and Chinese Language at the SOAS University of London in 2008. From New York University, she received her MFA in Creative Writing in 2014, where she was a Stein Fellow and a Veterans Fellow, in 2013 and 2014, respectively.

== Literary career ==
Her debut novel, The Book of M, a dystopian fantasy, was published by HarperCollins in 2018, and received mainly favorable reviews. Per The Hollywood Reporter, The Book of M was optioned for screen adaptation on television by Elizabeth Sarnoff from Universal Content Productions.

Her other works have been noted and reviewed by various publications and literary critics, including The Washington Post, Kirkus Reviews, Associated Press, The Wall Street Journal, Sun Sentinel, The Guardian, and Chicago Tribune, among others. Vivian Shaw, the editor from the Washington Post, wrote about The Cartographers in her book review:

"Shepherd, also the author of The Book of M, nails the sense of deep-seated, profound connection and love between a small group of people drawn together by shared experience and interest, creating an intense familial bond."

Shepherd is a recipient of a National Endowment for the Arts Fellowship (2020) and the 2019 Neukom Institute Literary Arts Award for "Debut Speculative Fiction" from the Neukom Institute for Computational Science at Dartmouth College. Her books have been translated to French, Polish, Czech, and Turkish, with the translation right sold in Chinese, Arabic, Dutch and Danish.

== Award ==
Year	Title	Award	Category	Place	Ref
2018	The Book of M	Goodreads Choice Awards	Fantasy	Nominated - 11	
2022	The Future Library	Ignyte Award	Novelette	Won	
2022	The Future Library	Utopia	Utopian Novelette	Nominated	
2022	The Cartographers	Los Angeles Times Book Prize	Mystery/Thriller	Shortlisted	

== Bibliography ==
- The Book of M (June 2018), ISBN 9780008225629.
- The Future Library (August 2021), ISBN 9781250828675.
- The Cartographers (March 2022), ISBN 9780062910721.
- All This and More (2024), ISBN 9780063278974

== Translations ==
- Polish: Księga M (The Book of M).
- Czech: Kniha M (The Book of M).
- Turkish: The Book of M: Kıyamet Başlıyor.
- French: Le Livre de M.
- Danish: Kartograferne.
