= Art forgery =

Creation and trade of falsely credited art

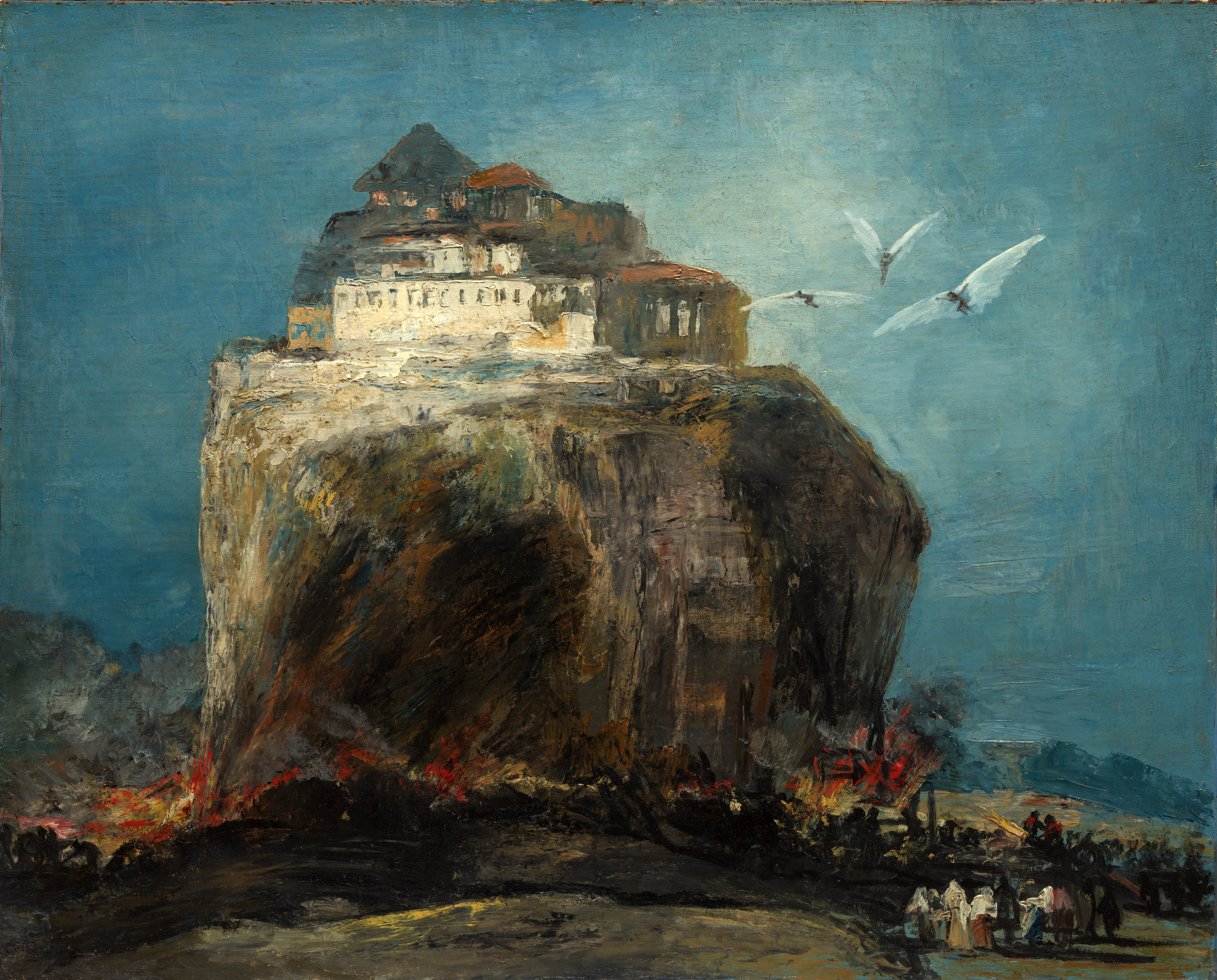
A City on a Rock, long attributed to Francisco Goya, is now thought to have been painted by 19th-century artist Eugenio Lucas Velázquez. Elements of the painting appear to have been copied from autographed works by Goya, and the painting is therefore classified as a pastiche. Compare to Goya's The Maypole.

Art forgery is the creation and sale of works of art which are intentionally falsely credited to other, usually more famous artists. Art forgery can be extremely lucrative, but modern dating and analysis techniques have made the identification of forged artwork much simpler.

This type of fraud is meant to mislead by creating a false provenance, or origin, of the object to enhance its value or prestige at the expense of the buyer. As a legal offense, it is not just the act of imitating a famous artist's key characteristics in a piece of art, but the deliberate financial intent by the forger. When caught, some of these forgers attempt to pass off the fakes as jokes or hoaxes on the art experts and dealers they were selling to, or on the art world as a whole.

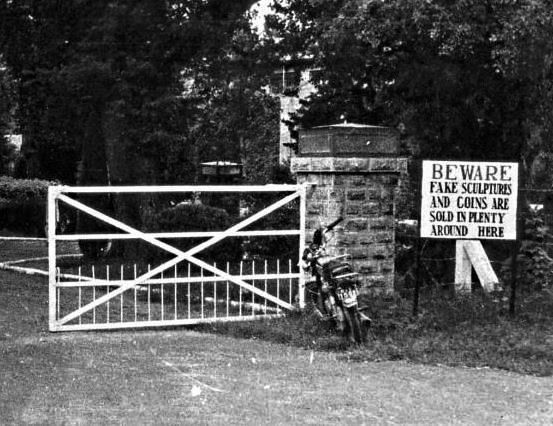
Sign at the Taxila Museum, Pakistan, 1981

Art forgers must pass themselves off as trustworthy and charismatic to recruit the necessary middlemen such as art dealers, sellers, experts, etc. as the forger will rarely deal in person. Forgers are often proficient in the current methods of art forgery authentication to reverse-engineer their work to cover up any potential mistakes that could get them caught.

Since the 1950s and 1960s there has been a growing demand for indigenous art. Many people began creating and selling faked busts, ceremonial masks, carvings, and sculptures to prestigious institutions such as the British Museum. Some artists even went as far as to create artifacts from cultures of which very little information is known, like Moabite, a Semitic culture that was alluded to in the Old Testament.

== History ==
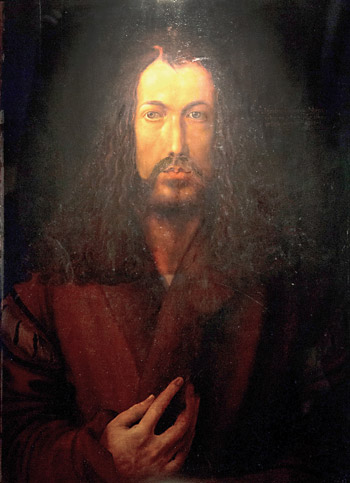
Forged self-portrait of Albrecht Dürer who lived from 1471 to 1528 by an unknown painter over a 1786 painting as confirmed by Dr. Kubach-Reutter of the Dürer House using X-rays and infrared radiation, with painting having been archived for almost two centuries in the Nuremberg City Museums

Art forgery dates back more than two thousand years. Ancient Roman sculptors produced copies of Ancient Greek sculptures. The contemporary buyers likely knew that they were not genuine. During the classical period art was generally created for historical reference, religious inspiration, or simply enjoyment. The identity of the artist was often of little importance to the buyer. The first recorded art forgery was in the Italian Renaissance and has since modernized alongside society.

During the Renaissance, many painters took on apprentices who studied painting techniques by copying the works and style of the master. As a payment for the training, the master would then sell these works. This practice was generally considered a tribute, not forgery, although some of these copies have later erroneously been attributed to the master.

Following the Renaissance, the increasing prosperity of the bourgeoisie created a fierce demand for art. Near the end of the 14th century, Roman statues were unearthed in Italy, intensifying the populace's interest in antiquities, and leading to a sharp increase in the value of these objects. This upsurge soon extended to contemporary and recently deceased artists. Art had become a commercial commodity, and the monetary value of the artwork came to depend on the identity of the artist. To identify their works, painters began to mark them. These marks later evolved into signatures. As the demand for certain artwork began to exceed the supply, fraudulent marks and signatures began to appear on the open market.

During the 16th century, imitators of Albrecht Dürer's style of printmaking added signatures to them to increase the value of their prints. In his engraving of the Virgin, Dürer added the inscription "Be cursed, plunderers and imitators of the work and talent of others". Even extremely famous artists created forgeries. In 1496, Michelangelo created a sleeping Cupid figure and treated it with acidic earth to cause it to appear ancient. He then sold it to a dealer, Baldassare del Milanese, who in turn sold it to Cardinal Raffaele Riario who later learned of the fraud and demanded his money back. However, Michelangelo was permitted to keep his share of the money. In the 19th century, an icon painter from Jerusalem began to create clay figures with mysterious inscriptions and sold them to the Altes Museum in Berlin after giving them this false origin.

Art forgery was documented as occurring in Imperial China and in contrast with the Western world, forgeries were seen in a much more positive light as the originals and faked works were seen as having the same level of prestige.

The 20th-century art market has favored artists such as Salvador Dalí, Pablo Picasso, Paul Klee and Matisse and works by these artists have commonly been targets of forgery. These forgeries are typically sold to art galleries and auction houses who cater to the tastes of art and antiquities collectors; at time of the occupation of France by German forces during World War II, the painting which fetched the highest price at Drouot, the main French auction house, was a fake Cézanne.

=== Africa ===
The earliest disputed case of forgery in Africa is the Olukun, the Bronze Head from Ife. German ethnologist Leo Frobenius collected the artifact in 1910 and was forced by British authorities to return it to the Ife palace for safekeeping in 1934. Eventually the head made its way back to the British Museum and while being cleaned in 1940 was erroneously found to be made by sand casting instead of lost-wax casting, alerting the museum that between 1910 and 1934 a fake had supposedly replaced the original bronze head. In 2010, a reexamination and metallurgical analysis of the sculpture conclusively proved the piece to be made by lost wax casting. It is therefore currently assumed to be the original head collected in 1910.

With many visitors to Africa in this time period, the art that was being created began to have more European aspects and inspiration behind them, such as crucifixion sculptures and Afro-Portuguese ivory carvings, and were often made with the intention of selling to tourists. These items went full circle in the case of authenticity; some suggest that it wasn't until these pieces became fetishized that they were authentic, while others say that even if they were made with traditional materials for a traditional purpose, they did not conform to traditional forms and therefore were not authentic.

=== Australian Aboriginal ===
Historically, Aboriginal artists were thought to be simply replicating the designs that existed since from the beginning of history and communicated to them by supernatural beings, ancestors, and/or ghosts. Because of this, individual creativity was not critically acknowledged and there was no reason why several people shouldn't participate in the creation of a single work. Today, if an artist is offered a prize or they sell a work under their name, they are presumed to be the sole creator of that work. If they have not been the sole creator but have credited themselves as such, they open themselves to the threat of misrepresentation and fraud.

Emily Kame Kngwarreye, one of the most famous Aboriginal artists from Utopia, Northern Territory, has some of the most widely forged works circulating. In the early stages of her painting career, she had inspired a school of learners under her who began to put out their own work under her name, and around half of the "Emily" paintings in the art market were fakes. Later on, the elders in her community were worried about the loss of income from her work and appointed a member who was a talented painter to continue on selling paintings as Emily.

Clifford Possum Tjapaltjarri was another highly forged painter who had helped initiate the 'Dot Style" paintings common in Aboriginal artwork. After gaining notoriety in the art market, Clifford began to sign other artwork by Aboriginal artists with his own name in exchange for gifts of cash. Ginger Riley Munduwalawala was another artist who began to sign his name on other artists work in exchange for money, and even took photographs with the art, some of which he posed with a paintbrush as if he was in the midst of working on them for further credibility.

=== Meso-America and pre-Columbia ===
The earliest recorded artifact forgery from the Meso-American area was in the 16th century when the Spanish administration began to create false works to meet consumer demands back home in Spain. When Mexico opened their borders after their War of Independence, they became a tourist attraction and a popular destination for North Americans and Europeans. These tourists bought enough artifacts for their curio cabinets that it created a market for forgeries.

In 1820, forgery workshops began to pop up, starting with the workshop on Tlatelolco Street in Mexico City. Later, the Barrios Brothers began their own forgery workshop near an archeology site in San Juan Teotihuacan. Favorite forged artifacts for these workshops were masks; specifically polished jade, greenstone, and stone masks. The stone masks that were created were meant to resemble the British Museum Xipe Totec masks. These stone masks and the Olmec-style masks have continued to appear in the art market since the 1930s.

== Forgers ==
There are essentially three varieties of art forger. The person who actually creates the fraudulent piece, the person who discovers a piece and attempts to pass it off as something it is not, typically to increase the piece's value, and the third who discovers that a work is a fake, but sells it as an original anyway.

Copies, replicas, reproductions and pastiches are often legitimate works, and the distinction between a legitimate reproduction and deliberate forgery is blurred. For example, Guy Hain used original molds to reproduce several of Auguste Rodin's sculptures. However, when Hain then signed the reproductions with the name of Rodin's original foundry, the works became deliberate forgeries.

=== Artists ===
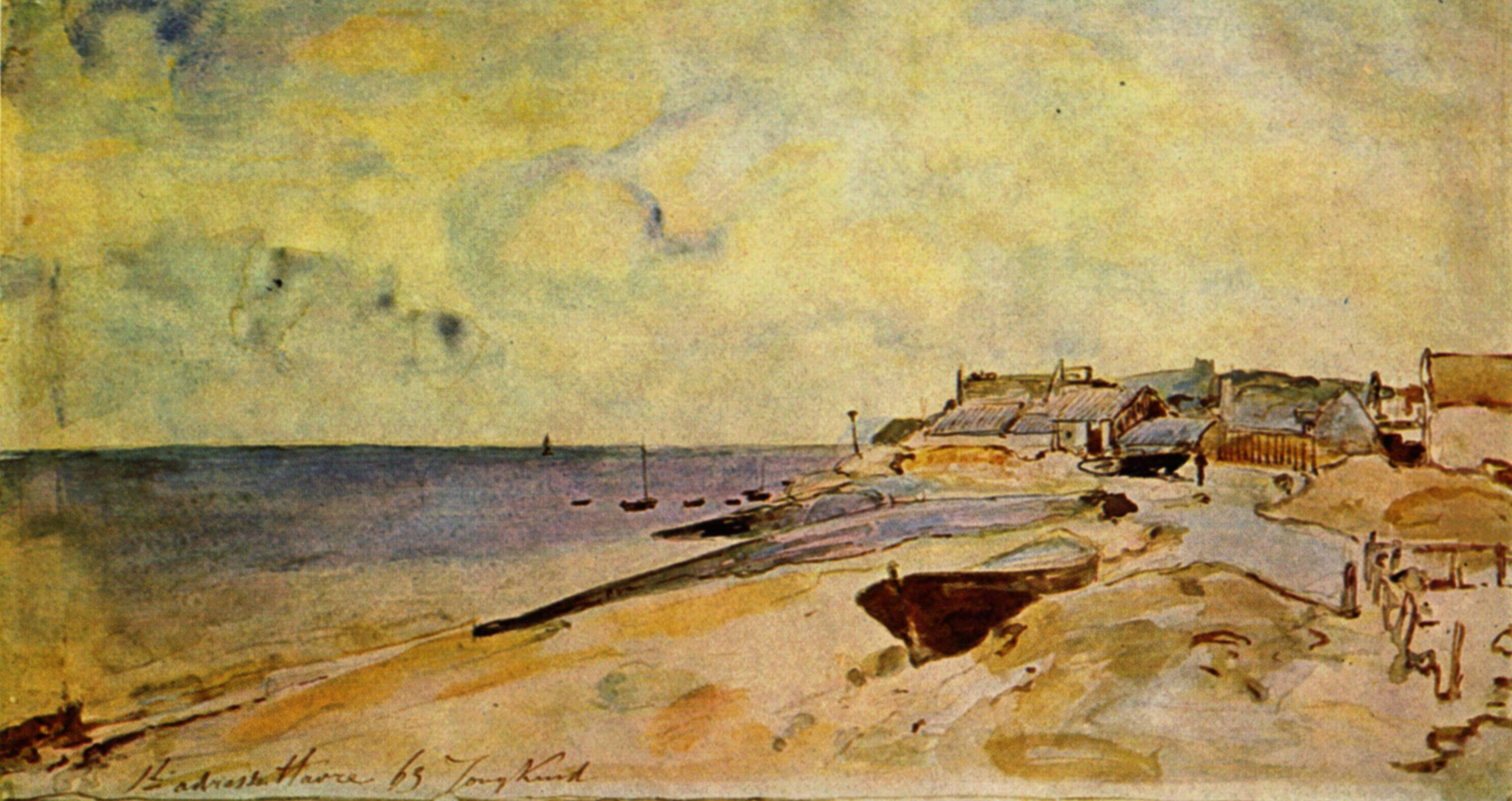
Strand von Ste. Adresse, 1863, a genuine original painting by Johan Barthold Jongkind.

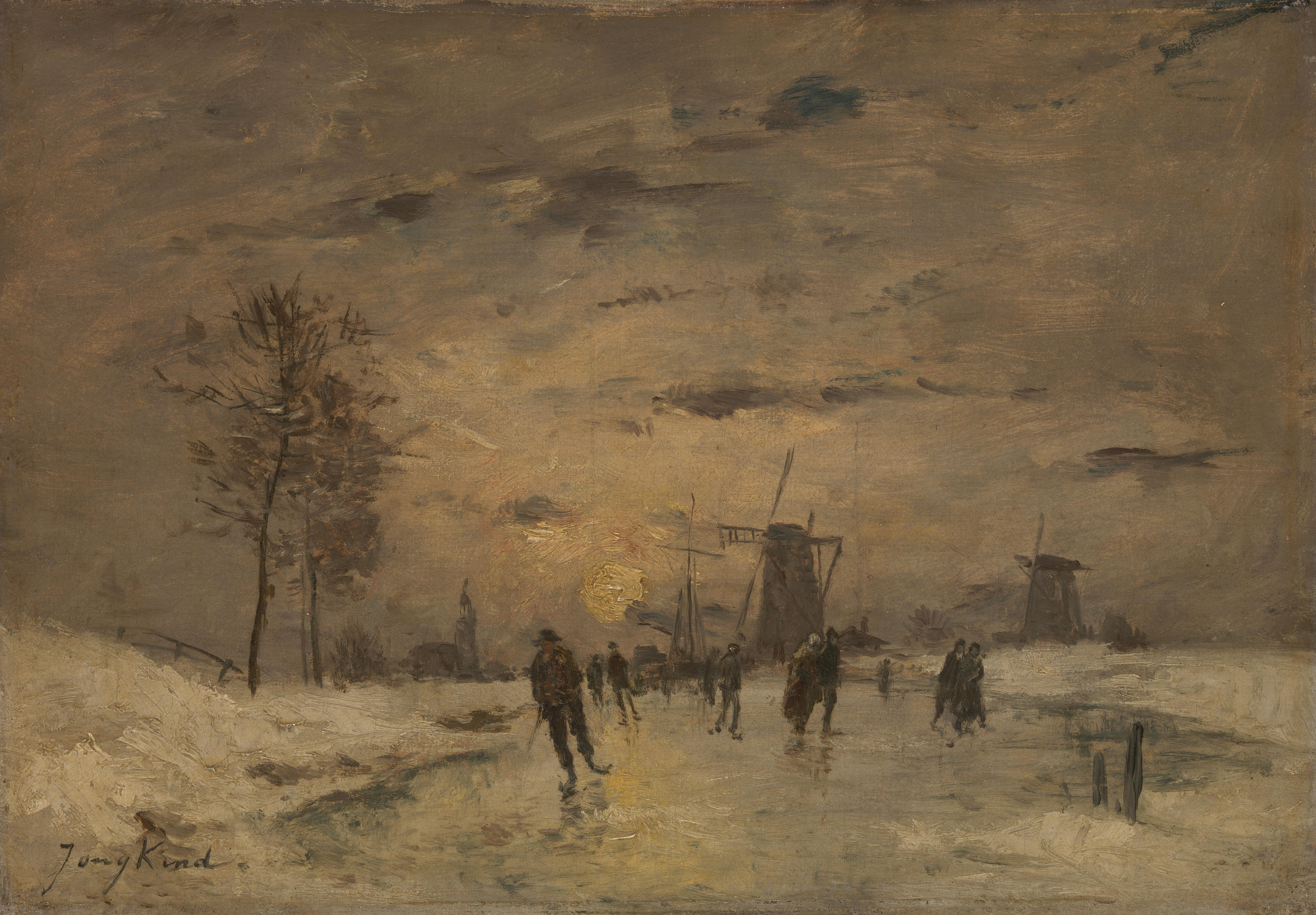
Skating in Holland, 1890–1900, signed "Jongkind" in the lower left hand corner, actually forged by an unknown painter.

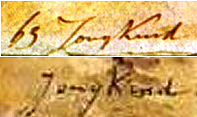
Signatures from the two works shown to the left. Top: authentic Jongkind, bottom: signature on forgery.

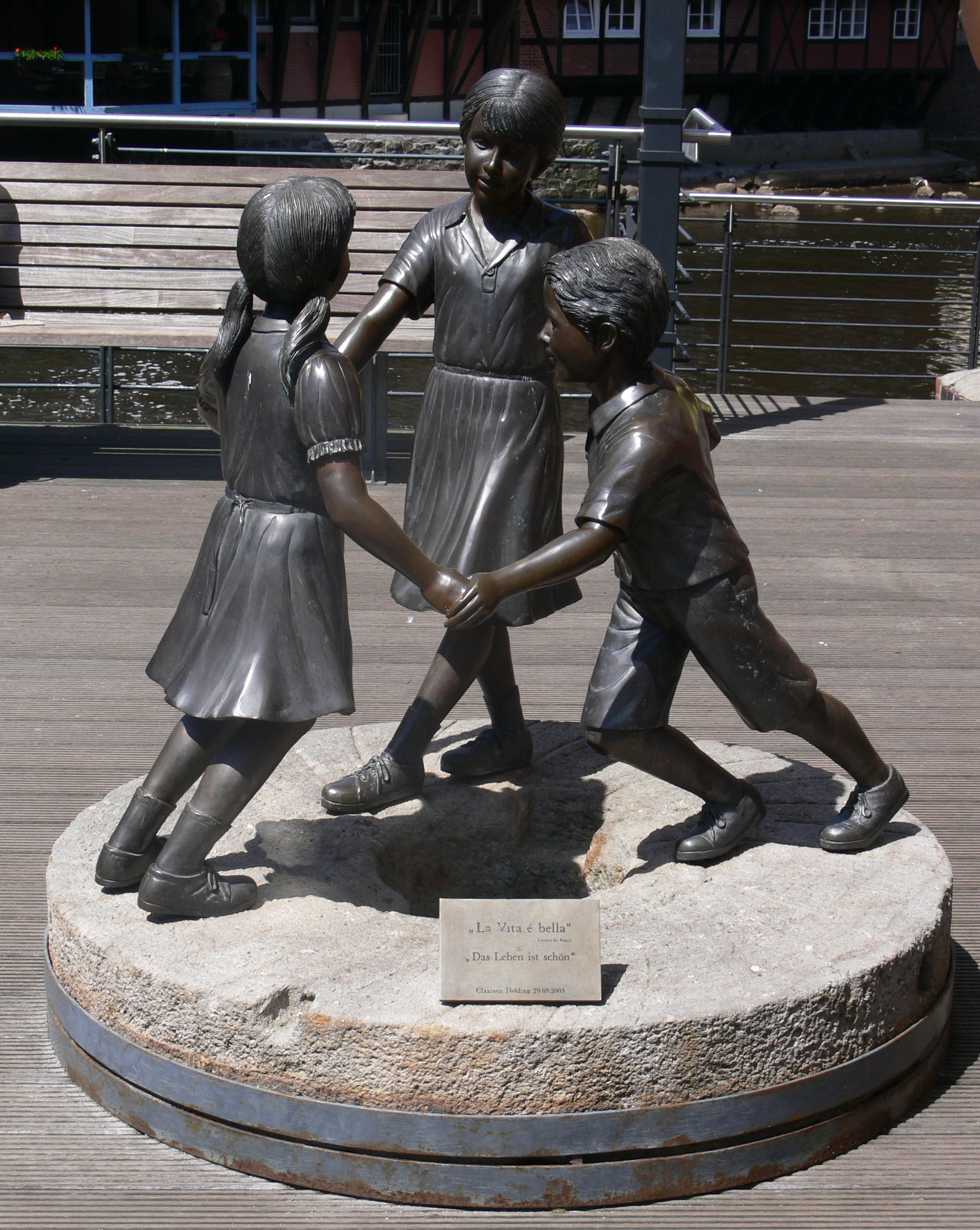
Das Leben ist schön, sculpture by "Leonardo Rossi", a fake name often used for plagiarized bronzes.

An art forger must be at least somewhat proficient in the type of art he is trying to imitate. Many forgers were once fledgling artists who tried, unsuccessfully, to break into the market, eventually resorting to forgery. Sometimes, an original item is borrowed or stolen from the owner to create a copy. The forger will then return the copy to the owner, keeping the original for himself. In 1799, a self-portrait by Albrecht Dürer which had hung in the Nuremberg Town Hall since the 16th century, was loaned to Abraham Wolfgang Küfner. The painter made a copy of the original and returned the copy in place of the original. The forgery was discovered in 1805, when the original came up for auction and was purchased for the royal collection.

Although many art forgers reproduce works solely for money, some have claimed that they have created forgeries to expose the credulity and snobbishness of the art world. Essentially the artists claim, usually after they have been caught, that they have performed only "hoaxes of exposure".

Some exposed forgers have later sold their reproductions honestly, by attributing them as copies, and some have actually gained enough notoriety to become famous in their own right. Forgeries painted by the late Elmyr de Hory, featured in the film F for Fake directed by Orson Welles, have become so valuable that forged de Horys have appeared on the market.

A peculiar case was that of the artist Han van Meegeren who became famous by creating "the finest Vermeer ever" and exposing that feat eight years later in 1945. His own work became valuable as well, which in turn attracted other forgers. One of these forgers was his son Jacques van Meegeren who was in the unique position to write certificates stating that a particular piece of art that he was offering "was created by his father, Han van Meegeren". A forger of note specializing in ancient artifacts, Brigido Lara, created the Monumental Veracruz style and produced an entire culture's worth of artifacts that ended up in museums around the world. After his early work was bought and sold on the black market, looters asked him to fix artifacts that they had stolen, Lara joined a forgery atelier that produced forged artifacts. In July 1974, Mexican authorities arrested and sentenced Lara to ten years in prison, claiming that he had been looting ancient ceramic artifacts in Veracruz, which he had denied and was able to prove that he had created them himself by making more replicas in the seven months he spent in prison before being released. Upon his release from prison, the Xalapa Museum of Anthropology offered him a job preserving artifacts and creating more replicas for their gift shop.

Forgers usually copy works by deceased artists, but a small number imitate living artists. In May 2004, Norwegian painter Kjell Nupen noticed that the Kristianstad gallery was selling unauthorized, signed copies of his work.

American art forger Ken Perenyi published a memoir in 2012 in which he detailed decades of his activities creating thousands of authentic-looking replicas of masters such as James Buttersworth, Martin Johnson Heade, and Charles Bird King, and selling the forgeries to famous auction houses such as Christie's and Sotheby's and wealthy private collectors.

=== Dealers ===
Certain art dealers and auction houses have been alleged to be overly eager to accept forgeries as genuine and sell them quickly to turn a profit. If a dealer finds the work is a forgery, they may quietly withdraw the piece and return it to its previous owner—giving the forger an opportunity to sell it elsewhere.

For example, New York art gallery M. Knoedler & Co. sold $80 million of fake artworks claimed to be by Abstract Expressionist artists between 1994 and 2008. During this time, Glafira Rosales brought in about 40 paintings she claimed were genuine and sold them to gallery president Ann Freedman. Claimed to be by the likes of Mark Rothko and Jackson Pollock, the paintings were all in fact forgeries by Pei-Shen Qian, an unknown Chinese artist and mathematician living in Queens. In 2013, Rosales entered a guilty plea to charges of wire fraud, money laundering, and tax evasion. In July 2017, Rosales was ordered by a federal judge to pay US$81 million to victims of the fraud. Pei-Shen Qian was indicted but fled to China and was not prosecuted. The final lawsuit connected with the case was settled in 2019. The case became the subject of a Netflix documentary Made You Look: The True Story About Fake Art, released in 2020.

Some forgers have created false paper trails relating to a piece to make the work appear genuine. British art dealer John Drewe created false documents of provenance for works forged by his partner John Myatt, and even inserted pictures of forgeries into the archives of prominent art institutions. In 2016, Eric Spoutz plead guilty to one count of wire fraud related to the sale of hundreds of falsely attributed artworks to American masters, accompanied by forged provenance documents. Spoutz was sentenced to 41 months in federal prison and ordered to forfeit the $1.45 million he made from the scheme and pay $154,100 in restitution.

Experts and institutions may also be reluctant to admit their own fallibility. Art historian Thomas Hoving estimates that various types of forged art comprise up to 40% of the art market, though others find this estimate to be absurdly high.

The Canadian art forger David Voss created thousands of forgeries of Indigenous artworks, in particular the work of the Anishmaabe artist Norval Morrisseau, of the Ojibway Bingwi Neyaashi Anishinaabek First Nation who had been deceased since 1987. He has forged documents between 1996 and 2019 as a part of a fraud ring that was based in Thunder Bay, Ontario. Working with a ring of eight people, they committed the largest art fraud in Canada, and Artforum magazine claims it was the "world's biggest art fraud."

=== Genuine fakes ===
After his conviction, John Myatt continues to paint and sell his forgeries as what he terms "Genuine Fakes." This allows Myatt to create and sell legitimate copies of well-known works of art, or paint one in the style of an artist. His Genuine Fakes copy artists such as Vincent van Gogh, Claude Monet, Leonardo da Vinci and Gustav Klimt, which can be bought as originals or limited edition prints. They are popular among collectors, and can sell for tens of thousands of pounds (GBP).

British businessman James Stunt has allegedly commissioned a number of "genuine fakes" by Los Angeles artist and convicted forger Tony Tetro. However, some of these works were loaned by Stunt to the Princes' Foundation, which is one of King Charles III's many charities, and displayed at historic Dumfries House, with the understanding that they were genuine. When Tetro claimed the works as his own, they were quietly removed from Dumfries House and returned to Stunt.

== Methods of detection ==
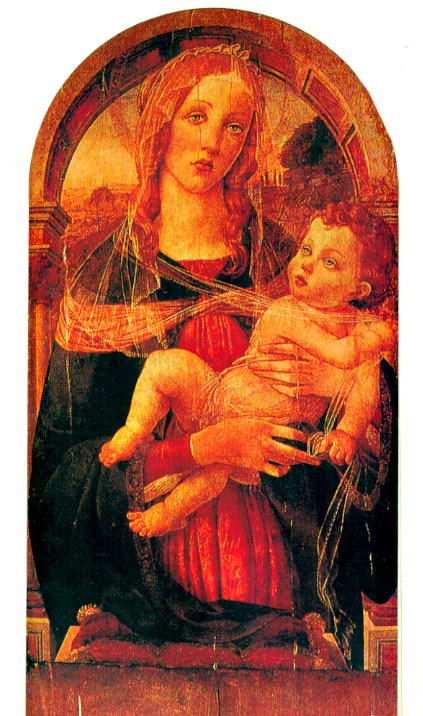
Tests of this Renaissance-esque Madonna and child painting revealed that the purportedly ancient wormholes in the panel had been made with a drill (they were straight, not crooked) and that the Virgin's robe was painted using Prussian blue, a pigment not invented until the 18th century. It is thought that this painting was created by an unknown Italian forger in the 1920s

The most obvious forgeries are revealed as clumsy copies of previous art. A forger may try to create a "new" work by combining the elements of more than one work. The forger may omit details typical to the artist they are trying to imitate, or add anachronisms, in an attempt to claim that the forged work is a slightly different copy, or a previous version of a more famous work. To detect the work of a skilled forger, investigators must rely on other methods.

=== Technique of examination ===
Often a thorough examination (sometimes referred to as Morellian Analysis) of the piece is enough to determine authenticity. For example, a sculpture may have been created with obviously modern methods and tools. Some forgers have used artistic methods inconsistent with those of the original artists, such as incorrect characteristic brushwork, perspective, preferred themes or techniques, or have used colors that were not available during the artist's lifetime to create the painting. Some forgers have dipped pieces in chemicals to "age" them and some have even tried to imitate worm marks by drilling holes into objects (see image, right).

While attempting to authenticate artwork, experts will also determine the piece's provenance. If the item has no paper trail, it is more likely to be a forgery. Other techniques forgers use which might indicate that a painting is not authentic include:

- Frames, either new or old, that have been altered in order to make forged paintings look more genuine.
- To hide inconsistencies or manipulations, forgers will sometimes glue paper, either new or old, to a painting's back, or cut a forged painting from its original size.
- Recently added labels or artist listings on unsigned works of art, unless these labels are as old as the art itself, should cause suspicion.
- While art restorers legitimately use new stretcher bars when the old bars have worn, new stretcher bars on old canvases might be an indication that a forger is attempting to alter the painting's identity.
- Old nail holes or mounting marks on the back of a piece might indicate that a painting has been removed from its frame, doctored and then replaced into either its original frame or different frame.
- Signatures on paintings or graphics that look inconsistent with the art itself (either fresher, bolder, etc.).
- Unsigned work that a dealer has "heard" is by a particular artist.

More recently, magnetic signatures, such as those used in the ink of bank notes, are becoming popular for authentication of artworks.

=== Forensic authentication ===
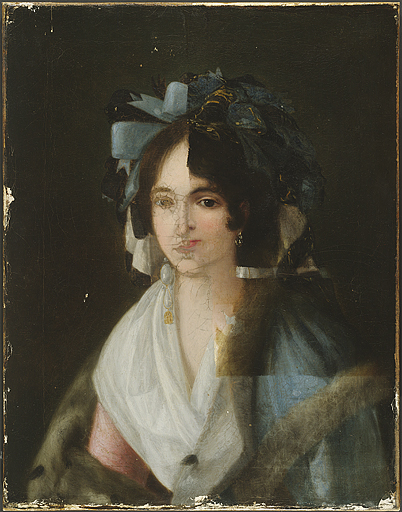
Portrait of a Woman, attributed to Francisco Goya. X-ray images taken of this painting in 1954 revealed a portrait of another woman, circa 1790, beneath the surface. X-ray diffraction analysis revealed the presence of zinc white paint, invented after Goya's death. Further analysis revealed that the surface paint was modern and had been applied so as not to obscure the craquelure of the original. After analysis, the conservators left the work as you see it above, with portions of old and new visible, to illustrate the intricacies of art forgery, and the inherent difficulty of detecting it.

If examination of a piece fails to reveal whether it is authentic or forged, investigators may attempt to authenticate the object using some, or all, of the forensic methods below:

- Carbon dating is used to measure the age of an object up to 10,000 years old.
- "White Lead" dating is used to pinpoint the age of an object up to 1,600 years old.
- Conventional x-ray can be used to detect earlier work present under the surface of a painting (see image, right). Sometimes artists will legitimately re-use their own canvasses, but if the painting on top is supposed to be from the 17th century and the one underneath shows people in 19th-century dress, the scientist will assume the top painting is not authentic. Also x-rays can be used to view inside an object to determine if the object has been altered or repaired.
  - X-ray diffraction (the object bends x-rays) is used to analyze the components that make up the paint an artist used, and to detect pentimenti (see image, right).
  - X-ray fluorescence (bathing the object with radiation causes it to emit X-rays) which can reveal if the metals in a metal sculpture or the composition of pigments are too pure, or newer than their supposed age. This technique can also reveal the artist's (or forger's) fingerprints.
- Ultraviolet fluorescence and infrared analysis are used to detect repairs or earlier painting present on canvasses.
- Atomic Absorption Spectrophotometry (AAS) and Inductively Coupled Plasma Mass Spectrometry (ICP-MS) are used to detect anomalies in paintings and materials. If an element is present that the investigators know was not used historically in objects of this type, then the object is not authentic.
- Pyrolysis–gas chromatography–mass spectrometry (Py-GC-MS) can be used to analyze the paint-binding medium. Similar to AAS and ICP-MS, if there are elements detected that were not used in the period, or not available in the region where the art is from, then the object is not authentic.
- Stable isotope analysis can be used to determine where the marble used in a sculpture was quarried.
- Thermoluminescence (TL) is used to date pottery. TL is the light produced by heat; older pottery produces more TL when heated than a newer piece.
- A feature of genuine paintings sometimes used to detect forgery is craquelure.

=== Digital authentication ===
Statistical analysis of digital images of paintings is a new method that has recently been used to detect forgeries. Using a technique called wavelet decomposition, a picture is broken down into a collection of more basic images called sub-bands. These sub-bands are analyzed to determine textures, assigning a frequency to each sub-band. The broad strokes of a surface such as a blue sky would show up as mostly low frequency sub-bands whereas the fine strokes in blades of grass would produce high-frequency sub-bands. A group of 13 drawings attributed to Pieter Brueghel the Elder was tested using the wavelet decomposition method. Five of the drawings were known to be imitations. The analysis was able to correctly identify the five forged paintings. The method was also used on the painting Virgin and Child with Saints, created in the studios of Pietro Perugino. Historians have long suspected that Perugino painted only a portion of the work. The wavelet decomposition method indicated that at least four different artists had worked on the painting.

== Problems with authentication ==
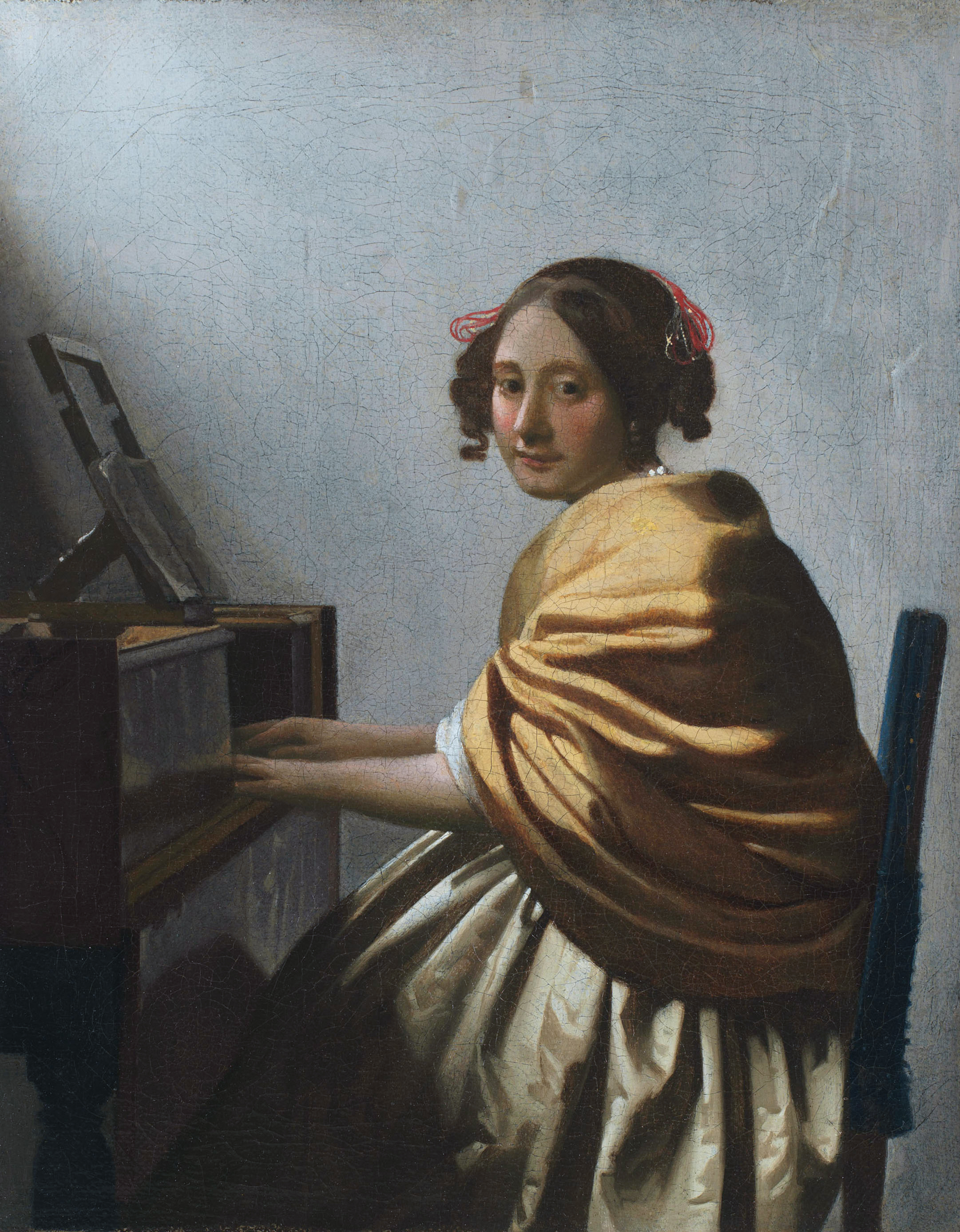
A Young Woman Seated at the Virginals, by Johannes Vermeer, (ca. 1670–72) initially regarded as a forgery from 1947 until finally declared genuine in March 2004, with some experts still disagreeing

Art specialists with expertise in art authentication began to surface in the art world during the late 1850s. At that time they were usually historians or museum curators, writing books about paintings, sculpture, and other art forms. Communication among the different specialties was poor, and they often made mistakes when authenticating pieces. While many books and art catalogues were published prior to 1900, many were not widely circulated, and often did not contain information about contemporary artwork. In addition, specialists prior to the 1900s lacked many of the important technological means that experts use to authenticate art today. Traditionally, a work in an artist's "catalogue raisonné" has been key to confirming the authenticity, and thus value. Omission from an artist's catalogue raisonné indeed can prove fatal to any potential resale of a work, notwithstanding any proof the owner may offer to support authenticity.

The fact that experts do not always agree on the authenticity of a particular item makes the matter of provenance more complex. Some artists have even accepted copies as their own work – Picasso once said that he "would sign a very good forgery". Camille Corot painted more than 700 works, but also signed copies made by others in his name, because he felt honored to be copied. Occasionally work that has previously been declared a forgery is later accepted as genuine; Vermeer's Young Woman Seated at the Virginals had been regarded as a forgery from 1947 until March 2004, when it was finally declared genuine, although some experts still disagree.

At times restoration of a piece is so extensive that the original is essentially replaced when new materials are used to supplement older ones. An art restorer may also add or remove details on a painting, in an attempt to make the painting more saleable on the contemporary art market. This, however, is not a modern phenomenon – historical painters often "retouched" other artist's works by repainting some of the background or details.

Many forgeries still escape detection; Han van Meegeren, possibly the most famous forger of the 20th century, used historical canvasses for his Vermeer forgeries and created his own pigments to ensure that they were authentic. He confessed to creating the forgeries only after he was charged with treason, an offense which carried the death penalty. So masterful were his forgeries that van Meegeren was forced to create another "Vermeer" while under police guard, to prove himself innocent of the treason charges.

A recent instance of potential art forgery involves the Getty kouros, the authenticity of which has not been resolved. The Getty Kouros was offered, along with seven other pieces, to The J. Paul Getty Museum in Malibu, California, in the spring of 1983. For the next 12 years art historians, conservators, and archaeologists studied the Kouros, scientific tests were performed and showed that the surface could not have been created artificially. However, when several of the other pieces offered with the Kouros were shown to be forgeries, its authenticity was again questioned. In May 1992, the Kouros was displayed in Athens, Greece, at an international conference, called to determine its authenticity. The conference failed to solve the problem; while most art historians and archeologists denounced it, the scientists present believed the statue to be authentic. To this day, the Getty Kouros' authenticity remains a mystery and the statue is displayed with the date: "Greek, 530 B.C. or modern forgery".

A comparable case is the Vérité kiʻi, a Hawaiian figure auctioned by Christie's in 2017 and donated to the Bishop Museum. Several specialists in Oceanic art argued that it was a later imitation; radiocarbon dating of the wood returned a range too broad to settle the question, and its age remains unresolved.

To combat these issues, some initiatives are being developed.

The Authentication in Art Foundation. Established in 2012 by experts from different fields involved with the authenticity of art. The aim of the foundation is to bring together experts from different specialities to combat art forgery. Among its members are noted experts such as David Bomford, Martin Kemp, and Maurizio Seracini.

The Cultural Heritage Science Open Source – CHSOS, founded by Antonino Cosentino. They "provide practical methods for the scientific examination of fine arts, historical and archaeological objects".

The International Foundation for Art research – IFAR. Established 1969, it is a "not-for-profit educational and research organization dedicated to integrity in the visual arts. IFAR offers impartial and authoritative information on authenticity, ownership, theft, and other artistic, legal, and ethical issues concerning art objects. IFAR serves as a bridge between the public, and the scholarly and commercial art communities".

Institute of Appraisal and Authentication of works of Art – i3A. A not-for-profit organization that gathers professionals of different fields, providing equipment and preparing procedure manuals aligned with international techniques, in the search of further knowledge on the production of Brazilian artists.

== Photographic forgery ==
Recently, photographs have become the target of forgers, and as the market value of these works increase, so will forgery continue. Following their deaths, works by Man Ray and Ansel Adams became frequent targets of forgery. The detection of forged photography is particularly difficult, as experts must be able to tell the difference between originals and reprints.

In the case of photographer Man Ray print production was often poorly managed during his lifetime, and many of his negatives were stolen by people who had access to his studio. The possession of the photo-negatives would allow a forger to print an unlimited number of fake prints, which he could then pass off as original. Fake prints would be nearly indistinguishable from originals, if the same photographic paper was used. Since unused photographic paper has a short (2–5 years) useful life, and the composition of photographic paper was frequently changed, the fakes would have had to be produced not long after the originals.

Further complicating matters, following Man Ray's death, control of printing copyrights fell to his widow, Juliet Man Ray, and her brother, who approved production of a large number of prints that Man Ray himself had earlier rejected. While these reprints are of limited value, the originals, printed during Man Ray's lifetime, have skyrocketed in value, leading many forgers to alter the reprints, so that they appear to be original.

== US legal issues ==
In the United States, criminal prosecutions of art forgers are possible under federal, state and/or local laws.

For example, federal prosecutions have been successful using generalized criminal statutes, including the Racketeer Influenced and Corrupt Organizations Act (RICO). A successful RICO charge was brought against a family which had sold counterfeit prints purportedly by Chagall, Miró, and Dalí. The defendants were also found guilty of other federal crimes including conspiracy to defraud, money laundering, and postal fraud. Federal prosecutors are also able to prosecute forgers using the federal wire fraud or mail fraud statutes where the defendants used such communications.

However, federal criminal prosecutions against art forgers are seldom brought due in part to high evidentiary burdens and competing law enforcement priorities. For example, internet art frauds now appear in the federal courts' rulings that one may study in the PACER court records. Some frauds are done on the internet on a popular auction websites. Traces are readily available to see the full extent of the frauds from a forensic standpoint or even basic due diligence of professionals who may research matters including sources of PACER / enforcing authority records and on the internet.

Prosecution is also possible under state criminal laws, such as prohibitions against criminal fraud, or against the simulation of personal signatures. However, to trigger criminal liability under states' laws, the government must prove that the defendant had intent to defraud. The evidentiary burden, as in all criminal prosecutions, is high; proof "beyond a reasonable doubt" is required.

Art forgery may also be subject to civil sanctions. The Federal Trade Commission (FTC), for example, has used the FTC Act to combat an array of unfair trade practices in the art market. An FTC Act case was successfully brought against a purveyor of fake Dalí prints in FTC v. Magui Publishers, Inc., who was permanently enjoined from fraudulent activity and ordered to restore their illegal profits. In that case, the defendant had collected millions of dollars from his sale of forged prints.

At the state level, art forgery may constitute a species of fraud, material misrepresentation, or breach of contract. The Uniform Commercial Code provides contractually based relief to duped buyers based on warranties of authenticity. The predominant civil theory to address art forgery remains civil fraud. When substantiating a civil fraud claim, the plaintiff is generally required to prove that the defendant falsely represented a material fact, that this representation was made with intent to deceive, that the plaintiff reasonably relied on the representation, and the representation resulted in damages to the plaintiff.

Some legal experts have recommended strengthening existing intellectual property laws to address the growing problem of art forgeries proliferating in the mass market. They argue that the existing legal regime is ineffective in combating this growing trend.

== UK legal issues ==
In the United Kingdom, if a piece of art is found to be a forgery, then the owner will have different legal remedies according to how the work was obtained. If bought at an auction house, then there may be a contractual guarantee which enables the buyer to be reimbursed for the piece, if returned within a set period. Further contractual warranties may be applicable through purchase meaning that terms such as fitness for purpose could be implied (ss.13–14 Sale of Goods Act 1979 or ss. 9-11 Consumer Rights Act 2015).

Detecting forgeries is difficult for a multitude of reasons; issues with the lack of resources to identify forgeries, a general reluctance to identify forgeries due to negative economic implications for both owner and dealer and the burden of proof requirement means its problematic to criminally charge forgers. Further, the international nature of the art market creates difficulties due to contrasting laws from different jurisdictions.

== Art crime education ==
In summer 2009, ARCA – the Association for Research into Crimes against Art – began offering the first postgraduate program dedicated to the study of art crime. The Postgraduate Certificate Program in Art Crime and Cultural Heritage Protection includes coursework that discusses art fakes and forgery. Education on art crime also requires research efforts from the scholarly community through analysis on fake and forged artworks.

== Art forgeries and heists in pop culture ==
=== Film ===
- F for Fake (1973, directed by Orson Welles and François Reichenbach) about Elmyr de Hory.
- How to Steal a Million (1966, directed by William Wyler) stars Audrey Hepburn joining a burglar (Peter O'Toole) to prevent technical examinations on Cellini's sculpture, Venus, that would expose both her grandfather and father as art forgers (the latter working on more forgeries by Cézanne and van Gogh).
- In Incognito (1998, directed by John Badham and starring Jason Patric), an expert in forging famous "third tier" artists' paintings is hired to paint a Rembrandt, but is framed for murder after meeting a beautiful Rembrandt expert.
- In the 1999 remake of The Thomas Crown Affair, Pierce Brosnan's millionaire character plays cat-and-mouse about a stolen (and then, on his initiative, forged) Monet painting with an insurance investigator (Rene Russo). Monet's San Giorgio Maggiore at Dusk is overlaid with a painting by Camille Pissarro, The Artist's Garden at Eragny.
- In the film The Moderns the lead character, artist Nick Hart, forges several paintings, including a Cézanne, for his art dealer. These are sold to a wealthy collector who, upon being informed that they are fakes, destroys them in the presence of company.
- The 2001 documentary film about international art forgery, The Forgery, consists of interviews with the well-known artist Corneille (Guillaume Cornelis van Beverloo) and Dutch art forger Geert Jan Jansen.
- In the Polish comedy Vinci two thieves are commissioned to steal Leonardo da Vinci's Lady with an Ermine. One of them does not want the precious painting to disappear from Czartoryski Museum and orders a forgery of it.
- In the 2007 film St Trinians the main characters steal and frame Vermeer's Girl with a Pearl Earring.
- In the 2014 film The Forger, the title character, played by John Travolta, attempts to forge a well known piece of art.
- In the 2012 remake of Gambit, Colin Firth's character plans to sell a forged painting from the Haystacks series by Monet, to a British billionaire (Alan Rickman). Already the owner of the genuine Haystacks Dawn, he has long been searching for Haystacks Dusk to complete his set. Although Haystacks is a genuine series of paintings by Monet, the two paintings in this film are fictional.
- A Real Vermeer is a 2016 Dutch biographical film about art forger Han van Meegeren .
- Han van Meegeren was played by Guy Pearce in the movie The Last Vermeer, which tells the story of the investigation into his sale of the painting "Jesus and the Adulteress" to Nazi officer Hermann Göring.

=== TV series ===
- White Collar is a series about Neal Caffrey (played by Matt Bomer), a convicted art forger who starts working with the FBI to solve cases for the White Collar Crime Division.
- Lovejoy, is about a roguish art dealer with a reputation for being able to spot forgeries.
- Midsomer murders there is an episode named The Black Book, which has many forgery paintings that are supposedly painted by a fictional 19th century painter named Henry Hogson.
- Leverage is a series about a group of criminals stealing money back from the rich and powerful, often featuring storylines that revolve around art forgeries.

=== Literature ===
- Tom Ripley is involved in an artwork forgery scheme in several of Patricia Highsmith's crime novels, most notably Ripley Under Ground (1970), in which he is confronted by a collector who correctly suspects that the paintings sold by Tom are forgeries. The novel was adapted to film in 2005, and the 1977 film The American Friend is also partially based on the novel.
- In Robertson Davies' 1985 novel What's Bred in the Bone, protagonist Francis Cornish studies with an accomplished art forger and is inspired to produce two paintings which are subsequently accepted by experts as original 16th-century artworks.
- In Russell H. Greenan's novel It Happened in Boston?, the protagonist is a madman, a serial killer, and an astonishingly good artist in the Old Master style, fooled into creating a painting that becomes accepted as a da Vinci.
- The Art Thief, an international best-selling novel by professor of art history Noah Charney, features a series of forgeries and art heists.
- In Clive Barker's 1991 novel Imajica, the protagonist, John Furie Zacharias, known as "Gentle," makes his living as a master art forger.
- William Gaddis' acclaimed 1955 novel The Recognitions centers on the life of an art forger and prodigal Calvinist named Wyatt Gwyon and his struggle to find meaning within art. The novel itself discusses the process and history of forgery in depth as well as the possible artistic merit of forged paintings.
- David Mitchell's novel Ghostwritten features a section set in the State Hermitage Museum in Russia, and follows a crime syndicate that steals artwork from the museum to sell on the black market, replacing the originals with high quality forgeries.
- The plot of Dominic Smith's novel The Last Painting of Sara de Vos revolves around a forged work by the fictional 17th century Dutch painter.
- B.A. Shapiro's 2012 novel The Art Forger is a fictional modern literary thriller involving art-forgery and fraud years after the historical art-heist at the Isabella Steward Gardener Museum.

== See also ==
- Archaeological forgery
- Authenticity in art
- Museum of Art Fakes, Vienna
- Works of Art with Contested Provenance

Notable forgeries

- Etruscan terracotta warriors
- Flower portrait
- Michelangelo's Sleeping Cupid
- Rospigliosi Cup sometimes referred to as the Cellini Cup
- Samson Ceramics forgeries/reproductions

Known art forgers and dealers of forged art

- Giovanni Bastianini (1838–1868), Italian forger of renaissance sculptures
- Wolfgang Beltracchi (born 1951), German forger
- William Blundell (1947–2023), forged Australian painters
- Yves Chaudron, France – forged Mona Lisa (1911)
- Zhang Daqian (1899–1993), forged Chinese art
- Alceo Dossena (1878–1937), Italian sculptor
- John Drewe (born 1948), sold the work of John Myatt
- Shaun Greenhalgh (born 1960), British forger
- Guy Hain (living), forged Rodin bronzes
- Eric Hebborn (1934–1996), British-born forger of old master drawings
- Elmyr de Hory (1906–1976), Hungarian-born painter of Picassos
- Geert Jan Jansen (born 1943), Dutch painter Karel Appel recognized one of Jansen's forgeries as his own work.
- Tom Keating (1917–1984), British art restorer and forger who claimed to have faked more than 2,000 paintings by over 100 different artists
- Mark A. Landis (born 1955), American forger who donated his works to many American museums
- Fernand Legros (1919–1983), purveyor of forged art
- Han van Meegeren (1889–1947), Dutchman who painted Vermeers
- John Myatt (born 1945), British painter, created forgeries for John Drewe
- Ken Perenyi (born 1947), American, forged works of American masters
- Ely Sakhai (born 1952), who twice sold Gauguin's Vase de Fleurs
- Jean-Pierre Schecroun (active 1950s), forged Picasso
- Émile Schuffenecker (1851–1934), French forger with Otto Wacker
- David Stein (1935–1999), U.S. art dealer and painter
- Tony Tetro (born 1950), prolific U.S. forger
- The Spanish Forger (early 20th Century), French forger of medieval miniatures
- William J. Toye (1931–2018), forged and sold the work of Clementine Hunter
- Eduardo de Valfierno (c. 1850–c. 1931), art dealer who worked with forger Yves Chaudron
- Otto Wacker (1898–1970), German purveyor of fake Van Goghs
- Kenneth Walton (living), prosecuted for selling forged paintings on eBay
- Earl Washington (born 1962), forger of prints that he attributed to a grandfather, allegedly named "E[arl] M[ack] Washington".
