= Heck =

Heck is a minced oath for "Hell". It may also refer to:

== People ==
- Heck (surname)
- Heck Allen (1912–1991), American author and screenwriter
- Heck Thomas (1850–1912), American Old West lawman

== Places ==
- Heck, North Yorkshire, England
  - Heck railway station
- Heck, Dumfries and Galloway, Scotland

== Other uses ==
- Heck (band), a British rock band
- Heck: Where the Bad Kids Go, a 2008 American children's novel
- Parnall Heck, a 1930s British four-seat cabin monoplane
- NOAAS Heck (S 591), originally USC&GS Heck, a survey ship
- Heck v. Humphrey, 1994 United States civil rights case
- Heck cattle
- Heck horse
- Heck reaction, a chemical reaction that forms a substituted alkene

== See also ==
- Heck's, a chain of discount department stores based in West Virginia, United States
