= Museum of Art Fakes =

Coordinates: 48°12′27″N 16°23′36″E

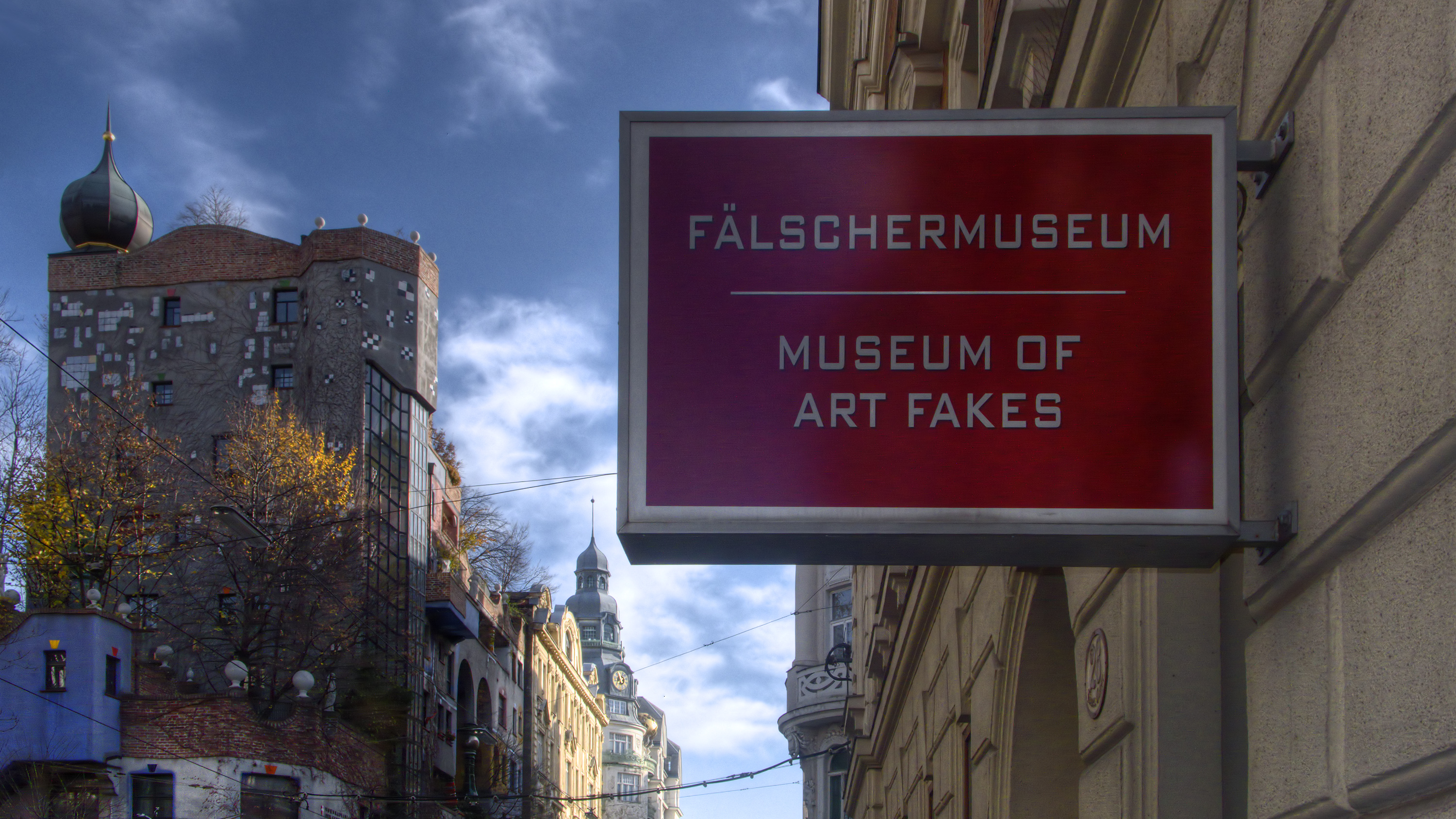
Museum of Art Fakes. Background left: the Hundertwasserhaus.

The Museum of Art Fakes (German: Fälschermuseum) is a museum of faked and forged artworks that opened in Vienna, Austria in 2005. This small, privately run museum in the Landstraße district, founded by Diana Grober and Christian Rastner, describes itself as "the world's only genuine art forgery museum"

== History ==
The pair were inspired to start learning about art fraud, and thus to start collecting forgeries after an encounter with famous art forger Edgar Mrugalla. Mrugalla's were the first works to be collected by the museum - donated by the forger himself.

== Exhibits ==
The exhibits include works by the renowned Vermeer-forger Han van Meegeren and the British art restorer Tom Keating, who claimed to have faked over 2,000 works by more than 100 different artists and deliberately inserted "time bombs" and anachronisms into his paintings. Keating's technique involved layering glycerine below the layers of paint which would dissolve when the painting was cleaned or restored, revealing the work as a fake. Also on display are items produced by Konrad Kujau, creator of the fake Hitler Diaries, as well as works by David Stein, Elmyr de Hory, Eric Hebborn and Lothar Malskat. The museum contains a total of almost 100 works.

The founders stress that the museum aims to teach visitors the different types of forgeries and copies. A copy is a legitimate copy of a work by another artist, not claiming to be completed by the original artist. Then, the two types of forgeries are an identical forgery, in which an image is copied like for like, with the painting claiming to be by the original artist. In addition, a standard forgery is a painting created in the style of another artist, claiming to be by that artist, that is not an identical copy of another work.

== See also ==
- Art forgery
