= Earl Washington =

Earl Washington may refer to:

- Earl Washington Jr. (born 1960), former Virginia death-row inmate whose conviction was overturned
- Earl Washington (musician) (1921–1975), jazz pianist
- E. M. Washington (Earl Marshawn Washington, born 1962), American entrepreneur, printmaker, engraver and counterfeiter
