= Roger Bissière =

French visual artist (1886–1964)

- Born: 22 September 1886; Villeréal, Lot-et-Garonne, France
- Died: 2 December 1964 (aged 78); Boissiérettes, Lot, France
- Education: École Supérieure des Beaux-Arts de Bordeaux, École des Beaux-Arts
- Occupation: Visual artist
- Known for: Painting, textile collage, stained glass design
- Spouse: Catherine "Mousse" Lucie Lotte (m. 1919–)

Roger Bissière (22 September 1886 – 2 December 1964) was a French visual artist and teacher. He designed stained glass windows for Metz cathedral and several other churches; as well as painted, and collaged textiles.

== Early life and education ==
Roger Bissière was born 22 September 1886 in Villeréal, Lot-et-Garonne. In 1901 the family moved to Bordeaux. His mother, Elisabeth Chastaignol, died 25 April 1902. He started painting at the age of 17.

In 1904 his father, Fernand Bissière, did not allow him to enter art school. Roger then travelled to Algeria.

From 1905 to 1910, he enrolled at the École Supérieure des Beaux-Arts de Bordeaux where he studied with Paul François Quinsac. Starting in September 1910, he studied with Gabriel Ferrier at the École des Beaux-Arts in Paris.

He married Catherine Lucie Lotte (nicknamed Mousse), 23 January 1919. Their son Marc-Antoine was born 15 July 1925.

== Career ==
Bissière published articles in the magazine L'Esprit Nouveau about Seurat (No. 1, 1920), Ingres (No. 4, 1921) and Corot (No. 9, 1921).

He was an art teacher at the Académie Ranson in Paris from 1925 until 1938.

In 1936, Bissière was one of the artists who executed Robert and Sonia Delaunay's designs for the Exposition Internationale des Arts et Techniques dans la Vie Moderne. He participated in the first three documenta exhibitions of 1955, 1959 and 1964.

After he realised his eyesight was deteriorating he was diagnosed with glaucoma in 1939. By 1950 his peripheral vision was severely affected and he underwent surgery. This stopped him from going blind but did not improve his eyesight, and he complained his eyes tired more quickly when he was painting.

== Death and legacy ==
Bissière died 2 December 1964, in Boissièrette, Lot, France. Rue Roger-Bissière (fr) in Paris is named in his honour.

== Forgeries ==
Between 1985 and 1995 John Myatt produced a number of fake Roger Bissière paintings for John Drewe, a purveyor of forged art.
