= Elmyr de Hory =

Hungarian painter and art forger (1906–1976)

- de Hory, c. 1970
- Born: Elemér Albert Hoffmann; April 14, 1906; Budapest, Austria-Hungary
- Died: December 11, 1976 (aged 70); Ibiza, Spain
- Occupations: Artist, painter, forger, criminal
- Known for: Forgery
- Website: myelmyr.net

Elmyr de Hory (born Elemér Albert Hoffmann; April 14, 1906 – December 11, 1976) was a Hungarian-born painter and art forger. It is claimed he was responsible for producing over a thousand forgeries that were sold to reputable art galleries all over the world. His activities garnered celebrity from a Clifford Irving book, Fake (1969), and a documentary essay film by Orson Welles, F for Fake (1974).

== Early life ==
De Hory claimed that he was born into an aristocratic family, that his father was an Austro-Hungarian ambassador and that his mother came from a family of bankers. However, subsequent investigation has suggested that de Hory more likely had a middle-class childhood; he was born Elemér Albert Hoffmann on April 14, 1906. (An acquaintance, Fernand Legros, said that de Hory was born in Budapest (Hungary) 14 April 1905, but that de Hory changed the date to 1914 to appear younger.) Both his parents were Jewish. His father's occupation was listed as "wholesaler of handcrafted goods". His parents did not divorce when he was sixteen, as he had asserted in the Clifford Irving biography.

At the age of 16, he began his formal art training in the Nagybánya artists' colony (now in Romania). At 18, he joined the Akademie Heinmann art school in Munich, Germany, to study classical painting. In 1926 he moved to Paris and enrolled in the Académie de la Grande Chaumière, where he studied under Fernand Léger. By the time he concluded his traditional education in Paris in 1928, the focus of his studies in figurative art had been eclipsed by Fauvism, Expressionism, Cubism and other nontraditional movements, all of which made his art appear passé, out of step with new trends and public tastes. This harsh reality and the economic shock waves of the Great Depression dimmed his prospects of making a living from his art. New evidence (Geneva police records) indicates charges and arrests for minor crimes during the late 1920s and 1930s.

De Hory returned to Hungary at the outbreak of the Second World War. Shortly after, he became involved with a British journalist and suspected spy. This friendship landed him in a Transylvanian prison for political dissidents in the Carpathian Mountains. During this time, de Hory befriended the prison camp officer by painting his portrait. Later, during the Second World War, de Hory was released.

Within a year, de Hory was imprisoned in a German concentration camp for being both a Jew and a homosexual. (His homosexuality was proven over time, and while investigation into his past has shown the likelihood that he was at one time christened as a Calvinist, such an ostensible religious affiliation did not stop the Nazi government from targeting a Jew for extermination.) He was severely beaten and was transferred to a Berlin prison hospital, from which he escaped. He returned to Hungary, and it was there, he said, that he learned that his parents had been killed and their estate confiscated. However, according to Mark Forgy's account, both de Hory's mother and brother were listed as Holocaust survivors.

== First forgeries ==
On arriving in Paris after the war, de Hory attempted to make an honest living as an artist, but soon discovered that he had an uncanny ability to copy the styles of noted painters. In 1946, he sold a pen-and-ink drawing to a British woman who mistook it for an original work by Picasso. His financial desperation trumped his scruples, as was most often the case for the next two decades. To his mind, it offered redemption from the starving artist scenario, buttressed by the comfortable rationalization that his buyers were getting something beautiful at "friendly" prices. He began to sell his Picasso pastiches to art galleries around Paris, claiming that he was a displaced Hungarian aristocrat and his offerings were what remained from his family's art collection or else that he had acquired them directly from the artist, whom he had known during his years in Paris.

That same year, de Hory formed a partnership with Jacques Chamberlin, who became his art dealer. They toured Europe together, selling the forgeries until de Hory discovered that, although they were supposed to share the profits equally, Chamberlin had kept most of the money. De Hory ended the relationship and resumed selling his fakes on his own.

After a successful sale of drawings in Sweden, he bought a one-way ticket for Rio de Janeiro in 1947. There, living from the sales of his fakes, he resumed creating his own art, though the sales of his portraits, landscapes, and still lifes in his own avant-garde style did not bring in the kind of money he had become accustomed to from his newly created master works.

In August 1947 he visited the United States on a three-month visa and successfully sold Picasso forgeries to the art dealer Klaus Perls. He decided to stay there, moving between New York City, Los Angeles, Miami, and Chicago for the next twelve years. De Hory expanded his forgeries to include works in the manner of Henri Matisse, Amedeo Modigliani and Renoir. When some of the galleries de Hory had sold his forgeries to were becoming suspicious, he began to use pseudonyms and to sell his work by mail order. Some of de Hory's many pseudonyms included Louis Cassou, Joseph Dory, Joseph Dory-Boutin, Elmyr Herzog, Elmyr Hoffman and E. Raynal. (Fernand Legros listed de Hory's pseudonyms; "Elmyr de Hory, Elmer Hoffman, Elementer alias Hofman, baron de Hory, Haury, Hury or Hurry, Hory, baron Raynal, Raynor, Raynol or Rainol, comte de Herzog, baron de Boughady, von Bonhyday, Boundjy, Elmyr Lazlo, Dauray, Dory, Boutin, Dory-Boutin, Cassou Robert or Cassou Charles, Louis Curiel or Curiel Charles.)

His success came to a halt in Boston after he sold one of his "Matisse" drawings to the Fogg Museum at Harvard University in the mid-1950s. Shortly after its sale, he offered a "Modigliani" and a "Renoir" drawing from his collection. An alert curator noticed a stylistic similarity among the three drawings and refused to buy his subsequent offerings. He then began contacting other institutions and galleries, asking if they knew or had purchased artworks from the debonair E. Raynal. The American art network thereby learned of the suave collector and seller of dubious works by modern masters.

== Forgery as a business ==
In 1955, de Hory sold several forgeries to Chicago art dealer Joseph W. Faulkner, who later discovered they were fakes. Faulkner pressed charges against de Hory and initiated a federal lawsuit against him, alleging mail and telephone fraud. De Hory later moved to Mexico City, where he was briefly detained and questioned by the police, not for his artistic endeavors but regarding his connection to a suspect in the murder of a British man, whom de Hory claimed he had never met. When the Mexican police attempted to extort money from him, de Hory hired a lawyer, who also attempted to extort money from him by charging exorbitant legal fees. De Hory paid the lawyer with one of his forgeries and returned to the United States.

On his return, de Hory discovered that his paintings were fetching high prices at several art galleries, and he was incensed that the galleries had only paid him a fraction of what they thought the works were worth. It is estimated that all de Hory forgeries were sold for more than $50 million in today's value. Further compounding de Hory's plight was that the manner of his forgeries had become recognizable, and he was now a person of interest to the FBI. This unwanted attention may have prompted de Hory to temporarily abandon his fakery and resume creating his own artwork once more. This led him to an ascetic existence in a low-rent apartment near Pershing Square in Los Angeles. Here, he had limited success, mostly selling paintings of pink poodles to interior decorators. However, his self-imposed exile was not to his liking. He decided to return to the East Coast return to producing art forgeries, for which he always found an eager buyer—eventually. In Washington, D.C., de Hory began an ill-fated association with a picture dealer that ended in disaster.

In 1959, suffering from depression, he attempted suicide by overdosing on sleeping pills. A friend rescued him and called an ambulance. His stomach was pumped, and after a stay in the hospital de Hory convalesced in New York City, helped by an enterprising young man, Fernand Legros. Legros's account of his dealings with de Hory differs substantially from de Hory's own. He portrays de Hory as an aggressive and persistent con man, who suckers Legros into the belief that he is a needy impoverished aristocrat deserving of Legros's charity, whereas in reality he is a person wanted by Interpol under a multitude of different aliases and convicted of a variety of crimes, forgery and fraud being not the least of them; de Horys is the object of pursuits, convictions and expulsions from France, Switzerland, Italy, Federal Germany, Great Britain, Mexico, the United States, and Canada, for false check writing without funds, check forgery, committing forgery while carrying a false name, theft, receiving and purveying of stolen goods, and embezzlement.

In de Hory's account, Legros accompanied de Hory back to Miami where he continued to regain his health. When he imprudently took Legros into his confidence, the other man quickly recognized an opportunity and importuned the artist to let him sell his work in exchange for a 40% cut of the profits, with Legros assuming all the risks inherent in the sale of forgeries. With Legros, de Hory again toured the United States. In time, Legros demanded his cut be increased to 50%, when in reality Legros was already keeping much of the profit. On one of these trips Legros met Réal Lessard, a French-Canadian who later became his lover. The two had a volatile relationship, and in late 1959 de Hory decided to leave the two and return to Europe.

In Paris, de Hory unexpectedly ran into Legros. De Hory revealed to him that some of his forgeries were still back in New York. According to de Hory, Legros devised a plan to steal the paintings and sell them, making a name for himself and his art gallery in the process. Later that year, de Hory's account continues, Legros persuaded de Hory to resume their partnership. Legros and Lessard would continue to sell de Hory's work and agreed to pay him a flat fee of $400 a month, enough to guarantee de Hory a comfortable and risk-free life in his newfound home, the Spanish Mediterranean island of Ibiza.

De Hory always denied that he had ever signed any of his forgeries with the name of the artist whom he was imitating. This is an important legal matter, since painting in the style of an artist is not a crime—only signing a painting with another artist's name makes it a forgery. This may be true, as Legros may have signed the paintings with the false names.

== Unmasking ==
In 1964, then 58 years old, de Hory began to tire of the forgery business, and soon his work began to suffer. Consequently, many art experts began noticing that the paintings they were receiving were forgeries. Some of the galleries examining de Hory's work alerted Interpol, and the police were soon on the trail of Legros and Lessard. Legros sent de Hory to Australia for a year to keep him out of the eye of the investigation.

By 1966, more of de Hory's paintings were being revealed as forgeries; one man in particular, Texas oil magnate Algur H. Meadows, to whom Legros had sold 56 forged paintings, was so outraged to learn that most of his collection was forged that he demanded the arrest and prosecution of Legros. Alarmed, Legros decided to hide from the police at de Hory's house on Ibiza, where he asserted ownership and threatened to evict de Hory. Coupled with this and with Legros's increasingly violent mood swings, de Hory decided to leave Ibiza. Legros and Lessard were apprehended soon thereafter and imprisoned on charges of check fraud.

De Hory continued to elude the police for some time but, tired of life in exile, decided to move back to Ibiza to accept his fate. In August 1968, a Spanish court convicted him of the crimes of homosexuality, showing no visible means of support, and consorting with criminals (Legros), sentencing him to two months in prison in Ibiza. He was never directly charged with forgery because the court could not prove that he had ever created any forgeries on Spanish soil. He was released in October 1968 and expelled from Ibiza for one year. During that time, he resided in Torremolinos, Spain.

One year following his release, de Hory, by then a celebrity, returned to Ibiza. He told his story to Clifford Irving, who wrote the biography Fake! The Story of Elmyr de Hory the Greatest Art Forger of Our Time. De Hory appeared in several television interviews and was featured with Irving in the Orson Welles documentary F for Fake (1973). In Welles's film, de Hory questioned what it was that made his forgeries inferior to the actual paintings created by the artists he imitated, particularly since they had fooled so many experts and were always appreciated when it was believed that they were genuine. In F for Fake, Welles also poses questions about the nature of the creative process, how trickery, illusion, and duplicity often prevail in the art world, and thus, in some respects, downplays the culpability of the art forger de Hory and outliers like him.

== Death ==
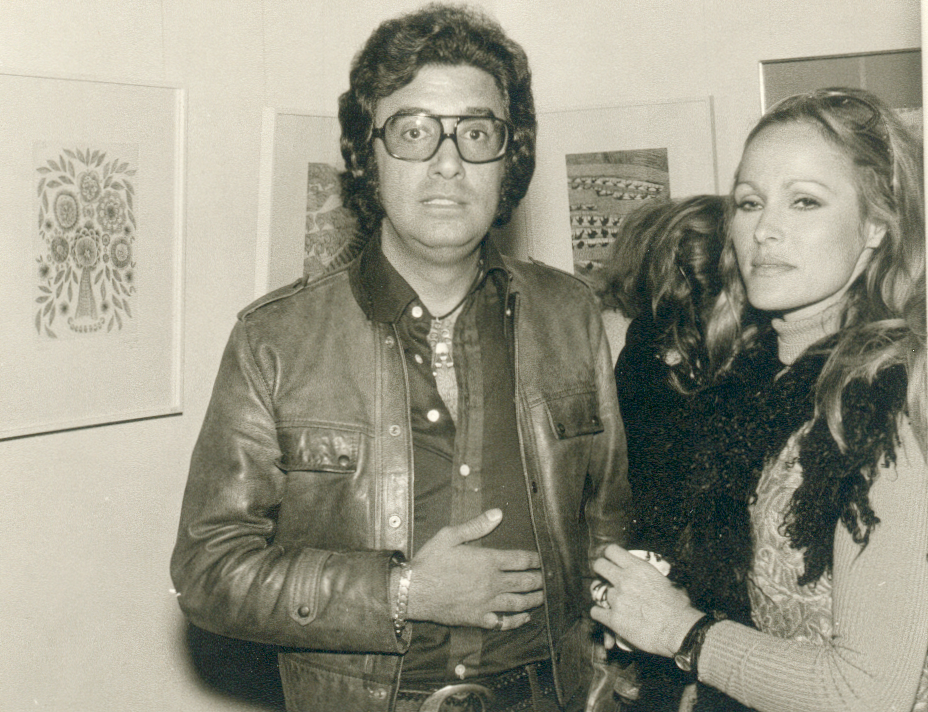
Ursula Andress and Vicenç Caraltó at the Elmyr de Ibiza art gallery, 1971

During the early 1970s, de Hory again decided to resume painting, hoping to exploit his newfound fame: this time, he would sell his own, original work. While he had gained some recognition in the art world, he made little profit, and he soon learned that French authorities were attempting to extradite him to stand trial on fraud charges. This took quite some time, as Spain and France had no extradition treaty at that time.

On December 11, 1976, de Hory's live-in bodyguard and companion Mark Forgy informed him that the Spanish government had agreed to extradite de Hory to France. Shortly thereafter, de Hory took an overdose of sleeping pills, and asked Forgy to accept his decision and not intervene or prevent him from taking his life. However, Forgy later went for help to take de Hory to a local hospital, though en route he died in Forgy's arms. Clifford Irving has expressed doubts about de Hory's death, claiming that he may have faked his own suicide in order to escape extradition, but Forgy has dismissed this theory.

== In popular culture ==
- Real Fake: The Art, Life and Crimes of Elmyr de Hory, a documentary by Jeff Oppenheim distributed by Gravitas Ventures, 2018
- Elmyr de Hory, le faussaire du siecle was produced by Dominique Barneaud and Jeff Oppenheim for Arte TV, 2017
- Intent to Deceive – Fakes and Forgeries in the Art World (2014–2015) an exhibition including works by de Hory, curated by Colette Loll.
- The Forger's Apprentice – The Musical – (2015) written by Mark Forgy, Kevin Bowen , and C. S. McNerlin.
- The Forger's Apprentice – (2013) written by Mark Forgy and Kevin Bowen . Performed at the 2013 Minnesota Fringe Festival.
- Portrait Of An Unidentified Man – (2011) a one-man play written and performed by Pierre Brault about de Hory.
- National Public Radio – US (2014) Snap Judgment, interview with Mark Forgy . Podcast available at: snapjudgment.org/elmyr
- Orson Welles' documentary F for Fake (French: Vérités et mensonges) concerns de Hory
- A restaurant in Atlanta's Little Five Points is named Elmyr for him and its walls are covered in fakes of famous paintings.
- The song No More Heroes, by British punk rock band The Stranglers, mentions de Hory in the line, "whatever happened to the Great Elmyr(a)?", but it is unclear if this is an error, an intentional feminization, or "Elmyr" with a separate exclamation after.
- A character based on de Hory appears in the incomplete final Tintin story Tintin and Alph-Art.
- Hory is also mentioned in Dale Basye's Fibble: where the lying kids go, the fourth in the series.
- In Fate/Strange Fake, the Caster servant, whose ability entails modifying and recreating legends, states that if you wanted someone to recreate legends without limit, you would have to call de Hory.
- The documentary Almost True: The Noble Art of Forgery (1997).
- Season 3 Episode 5 of the Bad Gays podcast, a history podcast about evil and complicated queer people, covers de Hory's life.
