= Quinsac =

Quinsac is the name of several communes in France:

- Quinsac, Dordogne, in the Dordogne department
- Quinsac, Gironde, in the Gironde department

== See also ==
- Paul Quinsac (1858–1929), French painter
