= Tony Tetro =

American art forger

Anthony Gene Tetro (born 1950), known as Tony Tetro, is an art forger known for his perfectionism in copies of artwork produced in the 1970s and 1980s. Tetro never received formal art lessons, but learned from books, by painting and experimentation. Over three decades, Tetro forged works by Rembrandt, Joan Miró, Marc Chagall, Salvador Dalí and Norman Rockwell and others. Tetro's paintings and lithographs, known for their perfectionism, were sold by art dealers and auction houses as legitimate works and hang in museums, galleries around the world. He was caught after Hiro Yamagata found a forgery of his own work for sale in a gallery.

In 1991, Gary Helton, an investigator for a California district attorney, described Tetro as "one of the two major [art] forgers in the United States."

== Early years ==
Tetro was born in Fulton, Oswego County, New York, one of four children to Beatrice and James Tetro, a house painter. As a young girl, Tetro's mother once watched Amelia Earhart land her plane in their family's pasture. His father developed a special process for coating water towers.

Tetro was an altar boy. His first trouble from his art came while at parochial school in Fulton, where he drew a picture of one of the nuns as a Vargas girl, but with a "pruney face" and wearing a habit. The nun hit him and took him to the priest.

Tetro married his high school girlfriend at age 16; she was pregnant and he became a father at age 17. In 1969, he moved to southern California and gained a job as a furniture salesman. The couple divorced a few years later.

== Art forgery ==
By 1973, Tetro was studying art by reading books and visiting museums. He never underwent formal art training or a desire to develop his own style, but he liked to paint and he liked copying from the masters. He found the exercise taught him more about the art, enabled him to understand why an artist had done a particular thing, which merely looking at a painting did not reveal. (Note: Copying, sketching or making studies from old masters is a common way for art students and artists to learn how to draw and paint. A tour description at the Museum of Fine Arts Houston says, "Artists in subsequent generations looked back to the work of Titian and others by visiting museums and making sketches of their work to learn the art of painting. This tour of Old Master paintings in the MFAH collection from the Renaissance through the 18th century explores how future artists would learn the skills of drawing, coloration, and composition from the artists who came before them." (See "Members Tour: Learning from the Old Masters".)) He learned about paper and canvas and experimented to find ways of producing craquelure, a characteristic of old paintings. Still a hobby, he began selling his copies at art fairs. He then began copying photographs and painting portraits. His hobby became a business and he became known within wealthy circles. The art market expanded in the 1980s and according to one Los Angeles art dealer, some people were more concerned about matching their carpet than they were about the authenticity of a painting. Reproductions were in demand and Tetro had a reputation for making flawless copies, even going so far as to travel to Europe to buy wooden stretchers and canvas particular to where a certain artist had worked. He has said that he never marketed his paintings and lithographs as originals and his business card read, "Tony Tetro. Art reproductions." Dealers told him his work would be sold to people who couldn't afford originals.

Tetro forged works by both contemporary painters and old masters including Rembrandt, Joan Miró, Marc Chagall, Salvador Dalí and Norman Rockwell. In addition to copying paintings, Tetro made an exact replica of a 1958 Ferrari TR, investing several hundred thousand dollars over six years. One gallery owner in Venice, California called Tetro "a brilliant mind" and a "genius".

Tetro became successful and wealthy, owning a tri-level condominium, a Rolls-Royce Silver Spirit, two Ferraris (in addition to his replica) and a Lamborghini Countach. He gambled in Monte Carlo and frequently traveled to Paris and Rome. With no visible source of income, local police and residents assumed he was a drug dealer and his car was frequently searched. Tetro denied being a drug dealer, but the more he defended himself, the less he was believed. Not until his arrest was this rumor disproved, a kind of relief for Tetro, who was proud he would finally be acknowledged as an artist.

=== Arrest and aftermath ===
His forgeries were discovered in late 1988 after Hiro Yamagata (artist) found a fake work of his for sale in a Beverly Hills gallery. Police found 250 forgeries during a search of Tetro's home in April 1989 and he was accused of conspiring with art dealer Mark Henry Sawicki to defraud four other art dealers by selling them forgeries. Gary Helton, an investigator for the district attorney's office, called Tetro "one of the two major [art] forgers in the United States."

Tetro was arrested and tried in Los Angeles in 1989. He was charged with 44 counts of felony forgery and one count of conspiracy. The costs of his defense forced him to liquidate his assets and ruined him financially. His lawyer was paid in cash until Tetro, out of funds, applied for and was granted a public defender.

Tetro sought to portray himself not as an art forger, but as an "emulator" who copied works, but did not intend to sell them as originals. He blamed art dealers for the fraud and said they commissioned him to create copies of paintings. His first trial ended in mistrial when jurors were deadlocked after 17 hours of deliberating, giving up after the third ballot. In order to convict, jurors had to be convinced of Tetro's intent to commit fraud. The district attorney decided to retry the case. With no more cash or assets to pay for a defense, in February 1993, Tetro pleaded nolo contendere to six counts of forgery, one count of conspiracy and one count of attempted theft. Part of his sentence included 200 hours of community service in which he was ordered to paint a mural on a public building. He was also sentenced to six months in a work release program, where he painted prototypes for traffic safety murals, and to five years' probation. He was released from jail in 1994.

== Media ==
While awaiting trial in 1989, Tetro was featured in a BBC documentary. The BBC science and technology magazine, Focus website has an article about how to forge a masterpiece based on Tetro's techniques. On December 17, 1991, he was featured in an episode of Nova, called "The Fine Art of Faking It".

In 2024 Con/Artist: The Life and Crimes of the World’s Greatest Art Forger by Tony Tetro and Giampiero Ambrosi won the Listen Award from the American Library Association.

== Present ==
Tetro currently produces copies and pastiches for private clients. He continues to use the techniques he used in producing forgeries, but is required by a court order to sign all of his works. Tetro has a daughter and several grandchildren. In a painting called Mona Sabrina, Tetro painted a portrait of his granddaughter as Leonardo da Vinci's Mona Lisa.

In May 2011, the Australian Art Series Hotel Group announced a competition in which people who stay a night at one of its hotels can try to pick an original Warhol from a line up of fakes created by the “world’s greatest living art forger”, Tony Tetro. People who pick the original could win an original Warhol (claimed to be valued at $20,000). Those who choose incorrectly might nevertheless get a “Warhol by Tony Tetro”.

The publicity stunt caused controversy. Although Art Series Hotel chief executive Will Deague claimed the Warhol Foundation had endorsed the competition as long as there was no use of any images on advertising material, the Foundation has been quoted as "being appalled to learn that a hotel would think it wise to commission forgeries in an attempt to market its services." Associate Professor Robyn Sloggett, director of the Centre for Cultural Materials Conservation at the University of Melbourne and an art authentication expert, withdrew from a panel to promote the competition, which included Tetro, art dealer John Buckley and writer Linda Jaivin, when she learnt about the commissioned fakes.

In November 2019, it was reported that four of the seventeen paintings that were loaned to Dumfries House by James Stunt were not works by Picasso, Dalí, Monet, and Chagall, but in fact were fakes that had been painted by Tetro. The paintings were later removed from display.
