= Geert Jan Jansen =

Dutch painter and art forger (born 1943)

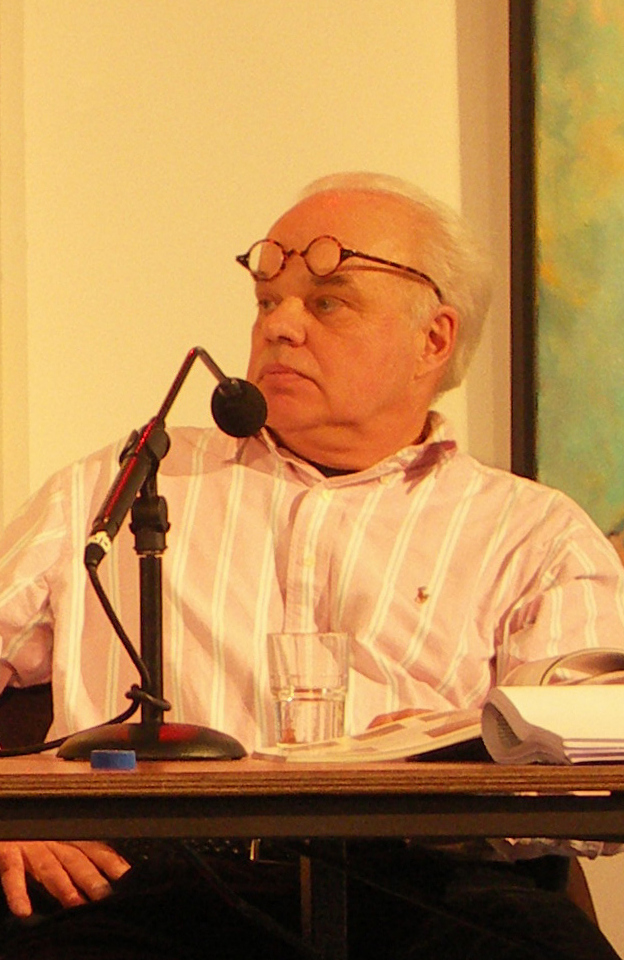
- Jansen in 2007
- Born: 1943 (age 82–83); Waalre
- Other name: Jan van den Bergen
- Occupations: Painter, Forger
- Status: Released
- Conviction: Forgery

Details
- Country: Netherlands, France
- Date apprehended: May 6, 1994.

Geert Jan Jansen (born 1943) is a Dutch painter and art forger, who was arrested in 1994.

Geert Jan Jansen was born in Waalre in the Netherlands. His engineer father was fond of art and Jansen became an art student. He befriended a US art dealer, Michel Podulke, who ran a gallery called Mokum in Amsterdam.

Later, Jansen opened his own galleries, Jacob and Raam, but was not particularly successful. When his business went badly, he decided to sign posters of Karel Appel's lithographs and sell them as originals. Later, he made his first Karel Appel forgery and sold it for 2,600 guilders. Thus encouraged, he sent another forgery to London; auction house sent a photograph to Appel, who stated that it was genuine. The gouache was sold at a record price.

In 1981, Dutch police were informed about a forged Bart van der Leck painting. They searched Jansen's house in Edam but found nothing. They did find 76 forged Appel lithographs in the ceiling of a local warehouse, but charges were not pressed. Short of evidence, the attorney general cut a deal with Jansen: He would not be charged if he would not make forgeries for three years.

In 1988, Jansen released another batch of Appel paintings. When they were found to be forgeries, gallery owners blamed each other. In June 1988, police confiscated hundreds of Appel forgeries from the MAT gallery in Amsterdam. The owner of the gallery said that he had bought 100 Appel forgeries from the Tripple Tree Gallery, who had bought them from a dealer Henk Ernste in Paris. Ernste was later arrested but the case was settled with a 5.5 million guilder fine. During the furor, Jansen moved from the Netherlands to France with his partner.

In March 1994, "Jan van den Bergen" came to the auction house Karl & Faber in Munich. He claimed to be an art dealer from Orléans and presented his business card. With him he had a Chagall drawing, an Asger Jorn gouache and a Karel Appel painting. The first two had written certificates of authenticity. He wanted them to be auctioned quickly and left in a hurry.

Expert Sue Cubitt of the auction house had the works examined. The Chagall certificate had a spelling error and she became suspicious. Jan Nieuwenhuizen Segaar, a representative of Karel Appel, contacted the artist who said that the work was his but Cubitt was still suspicious. The Chagall committee in Paris verified that the certificate was a forgery and therefore the drawing was also a forgery. A similar thing happened with the Asger Jorn certificate. The auction house decided to withdraw all the works from sale because it could not guarantee their authenticity. Sue Cubitt decided to inform Ernst Schöller of the Stuttgart Fine Art and Antiquities squad.

When Sue Cubitt and the police checked other auction catalogues, they noticed that similar works of art had been offered for sale and discovered Van den Bergen had offered these and other works for sale in auction houses around Europe. When Schöller checked the Orléans gallery address, he found that it was a fake; there was a wine bottle company at that address.

The trail of false addresses companies led Schöller and the French police to a farm in La Chaux near Poitiers. Jansen - who had used the name Van den Bergen - and his associate were arrested May 6, 1994.

When police investigated the farm, they found 1600 forged artworks. Forged artists included Cocteau, Dufy, Ferdinand Erfmann, Charles Eyck, Leo Gestel, Bart van der Leck, Matisse, Miró and the most popular target of forgery, Picasso.

French police had few leads and their appeal through the media brought no reports of forgery. Six years later, they checked the auction records of a Drouot gallery where Jansen had traded most of his forgeries through a number of different false names. They confiscated some suspicious paintings and threatened their buyers with complicity in the crime if they did not press charges against Jansen.

Jansen went on trial in September 2000 in Orléans. By that time, the police had thousands of forgeries. During the trial Jansen's lawyer demanded that the works not be destroyed in case there were real works among them. However, most of the charges were later dropped - two of the buyers disappeared - and only two remained.

Eventually Jansen was sentenced to one year imprisonment and four additional years suspended sentence. He was exiled from France for three years. All of his works were to be destroyed. Jansen planned to appeal.

It is estimated that Geert Jan Jansen made €10 million from his forgeries.
