= Jean-Pierre Schecroun =

French painter (1929–1991)

Jean-Pierre Raphael Schecroun (17 January 1929 – 17 July 1991) was a French painter and art forger who made forgeries of work of modern masters, including Picasso and Braque.

Schecroun was born in Antananarivo, Madagascar on 17 January 1929. He was arrested for forgery in 1962. At the time he had made eight forgeries in two years and earned around £25,000. He claimed that his intention was to expose the credulity of the art dealers who refused to buy his own work but paid large sums for his forgeries. Schecroun died in Paris on 17 July 1991, at the age of 62.
