= John Myatt =

English painter

John Myatt (born 1945) is a British artist convicted of art forgery who, with John Drewe, perpetrated what has been described as "the biggest art fraud of the 20th century". In 1999 he was convicted of conspiracy to defraud and imprisoned for four months. Since his conviction, Myatt has continued to paint in the style of famous artists, selling his works as "genuine fakes".

== Early life ==
The son of a farmer, Myatt attended art school and discovered a talent for mimicking other artists' styles but at first only painted for amusement and for friends. He worked as a songwriter for a time and co-wrote the song "Silly Games", a UK no. 2 hit for Janet Kay in 1979. He later worked as a teacher in Staffordshire.

== Painting ==
When his wife left him in 1985, Myatt gave up teaching to spend more time with his children, and attempted to make a living by painting original works in the style of well-known artists. He placed an advertisement in Private Eye magazine which read "Genuine fakes. Nineteenth and twentieth century paintings from £150". He was initially honest about the nature of his paintings, but John Drewe, a regular customer, was able to re-sell some of his paintings as genuine works. When he later told Myatt that Christie's had accepted his "Albert Gleizes" painting as genuine and paid £25,000, Myatt became a willing accomplice to Drewe's fraud, and began to paint more pictures in the style of masters like Roger Bissière, Marc Chagall, Le Corbusier, Jean Dubuffet, Alberto Giacometti, Matisse, Ben Nicholson, Nicolas de Staël and Graham Sutherland.

== Forgeries ==
According to the police estimates, Myatt painted about 200 forgeries in a regular schedule and delivered them to Drewe in London. Police later recovered only sixty of them. Drewe sold them to the auction houses of Christie's, Phillips and Sotheby's and to dealers in London, Paris and New York.

== Arrest and trial ==
In September 1995, Myatt was arrested by Scotland Yard detectives. He quickly confessed, stating that he had created the paintings using emulsion paint and K-Y Jelly, a mixture that dried quickly but was hardly reminiscent of the original pigments. He is believed to have earned around £50,000, and offered to return the money and help convict Drewe. He had come to dislike the deception and Drewe. However the total sum of profits made through Myatt's forgeries exceeds €25 million.

On 16 April 1996 police raided Drewe's gallery in Reigate, Surrey, south of London, and found materials he had used to forge certificates of authenticity. Drewe had also altered the provenances of genuine paintings to link them to Myatt's forgeries, and added bogus documents to archives of various institutions in order to "prove" the authenticity of the forgeries.

The trial of Myatt and Drewe began in September 1998. On 13 February 1999 John Myatt was sentenced to one year in prison for a conspiracy to defraud. He was released the following June after serving four months of his sentence. Drewe was sentenced to six years for conspiracy and served two.

== Current career ==
After his release, Myatt has continued to paint commissioned portraits and clear copies, and has held exhibitions of his work. His "genuine fakes" are popular amongst collectors as an affordable alternative for a highly sought-after artist or artwork. Some of his most copied artworks include Impressionist and Post-Impressionist artists, Claude Monet and Vincent van Gogh.

In 2020 it is reported that a film is to be made about Myatt's case, written by Justin Michel and Julie Daly-Wallman. It is a Green Eye Production Academy production and with the confirmed title "Genuine Fakes". John Myatt now works alongside law enforcement in helping to expose fraudsters.

Myatt also has a television show on Sky Arts called Fame in the Frame. He has a private sitting with one celebrity each episode and paints a portrait of them in the style of a famous artist. Episodes include painting singer and songwriter Ian Brown in the style of Paul Cézanne and actor and comedian Stephen Fry in the style of Diego Velázquez. Myatt now hosts his own series – Virgin Virtuosos on Sky Arts, where he takes celebrities and recreates a famous painting.

Myatt has said of his works,

When I paint in the style of one of the greats… Monet, Picasso, Van Gogh… I am not simply creating a copy or pale imitation of the original. Just as an actor immerses himself into a character, I climb into the minds and lives of each artist. I adopt their techniques and search for the inspiration behind each great artist’s view of the world. Then, and only then, do I start to paint a ‘Legitimate Fake’.
