= Ely Sakhai =

American art dealer (born 1952)

Ely Sakhai (born 1952) is an American art dealer and civil engineer who owned Manhattan art galleries The Art Collection and Exclusive Art. He was later charged and convicted for selling forged art and was sentenced to 41 months in federal prison for fraud. After his release he continued to operate The Art Collection in Great Neck, New York.

== Art galleries ==
Sakhai emigrated from Iran to the United States in 1962 and gained a civil engineering degree from Columbia University. He later developed an interest in art and opened a number of small art galleries in the 1970s and 1980s. In the 1980s, Sakhai purchased a range of Impressionist and Post-Impressionist works by artists including Marc Chagall, Paul Gauguin, Marie Laurencin, Monet, Auguste Renoir and Paul Klee.

Sakhai and his wife became active members of the Long Island community where they donated money to Jewish organisations and established a Torah study centre.

== Art forgery allegations ==
According to the Federal Bureau of Investigation and the United States Attorney's Office, Sakhai bought lesser-known works and had the paintings copied by Chinese immigrants working in the upstairs area of his gallery.

Sakhai then took the genuine certificates of authenticity and attached them to copies to sell. Months or years later he would obtain a new certificate of authenticity for the original and then sell it. In several instances he sold the forgeries to Asian collectors and real works to New York and London galleries. According to reports, Japanese collectors trusted the certificates and would not subsequently commission European experts to authenticate the paintings. Sakhai would also buy relatively worthless paintings to reuse the canvases for new forgeries. Sakhai denied involvement and suggested that he often consigned paintings to other dealers which put them out of his control.

== Charges and conviction ==
In May 2000, both Christie's and Sotheby's realized they were both offering Paul Gauguin's Vase de Fleurs (also known as Lilas), both supposedly original. Both auction houses took the paintings to Gauguin expert Sylvie Crussard at the Wildenstein Institute in Paris. She confirmed that the Christie's painting was a forgery; Christie's had to withdraw their catalogue from the printers. They also informed the owners, Gallery Muse in Tokyo. The original painting was auctioned at Sotheby's and Ely Sakhai received $310,000 which was traced by the FBI.

On March 9, 2000, the FBI arrested Sakhai at his gallery on Broadway and charged him with eight counts of wire and mail fraud and estimated Sakhai had made $25 million from the deals. He was later released on bail.

On March 4, 2004, Sakhai was charged with eight counts of fraud, and again released on bail. Later in 2004 he pleaded guilty to, according to his lawyer, "resolve his difficulties with the government and get this behind him". In July 2005 he was sentenced to 41 months in prison, fined $12.5 million, and ordered to forfeit eleven works of art. Both before and after charges were laid, Sakhai maintained he was innocent and openly discussed the case and his other business ventures with journalists.

== Other business ventures ==
After charges were laid against him, Sakhai closed his Manhattan galleries and opened a new gallery, The Art Collection, in Great Neck, New York, which he continued to operate after his imprisonment. In 2009, Sakhai cooperated with ICE agents seeking to return a copy of Belgian artist Anto Carte's Young Girl in a Blue Dress stolen by the Nazis during World War II.

Sakhai remains a resident of New York.
