= Hiro Yamagata (artist) =

Japanese artist (born 1948)

Hiro Yamagata (born 山形 博導 Hiromichi Yamagata, May 30, 1948, in Maihara, in Shiga prefecture, Japan) is a painter/artist, based in Los Angeles, California.

As a silkscreen artist, he is known for his use of vivid colors in his pieces. He is also known for his use of laser and hologram technology recently, and is recognized as a pioneer in the former.

== Life in Japan ==
Yamagata is the third child and has five siblings. His father ran a lumber business. Whilst at high school between 1964 and 1967 he won awards and began to use lights in his work. In 1967 he became a student of Masachika Sugimura before moving to Tokyo, where he worked part-time at an artist's material shop and later as an illustrator and a designer for an advertising company.

He established JIM with Yuhji Itsumi, Youichi Sai, and Takeshi Shino in Shibuya, Tokyo in 1972.

== Life in Europe ==
In 1972, he moved to Milan to live with a girlfriend. When the relationship ended he decided to move to Paris and settled there. His first solo exhibition was held in Wien in 1973. Most of his works in the mid-1970s were paintings in water and oil colors. He became fascinated with Jazz and organized events in the music idiom at his own expense. In 1974 an installation work using lasers was shown at a theater in Paris.

== Life in America ==
=== 1980s ===
In 1978, Yamagata moved to Los Angeles and started to use bright silkscreen colors in his work.

In the 1980s, he produced work for the Air & Space Bicentennial (1983), the 1984 Olympics, the hundredth memorial anniversary of the Statue of Liberty (1986), the Australia foundation memorial (1988), and the hundredth anniversary of the Eiffel Tower (1988). In 1988 he started a series of work about golf in collaboration with Jack Nicklaus. He participated in a charity art project, "Very Special Arts" and an exhibition of his work toured Tokyo, Osaka, Nagoya, Yokohama, and Fukuoka, Japan. He published a book of his work in 1987.

In 1987, he established the Yamagata Foundation and in collaboration with the Kennedy Foundation held a charity event for physically disadvantaged people. He donated all sales of his piece, "Fireworks," to the International Red Cross Society for victims' relief of the San Francisco earthquake.

In 1989 Yamagata started legal action against art forger Tony Tetro. The trial lasted until June 1991 when it ended in a mistrial.

=== 1990s ===
A book of the artists work, Yamagata, with texts written by Arnold Schwarzenegger, was published in 1990. Some of the works in the book were inspired by the birth of his son Yuta, who later became known as the lead singer in the Japanese hip hop group Yuta and the Bushido Boys.

In the 1990s, Yamagata created official art works for a celebration of 200 years of emigration to America (1990), the Freedom Campaign in Berlin (1990), the 500th anniversary of Columbus's first visit to the New World (1991), the 3rd IAAF World Championships in Athletics, Osaka (1991), the Barcelona Olympics (1992), Kyoto 1200 year celebration (1992) and the Atlanta Olympics (1995).

At the prompting of Beat poet Allen Ginsberg, Yamagata started giving poet Gregory Corso a monthly stipend in 1992, which allowed Corso to live comfortably for the rest of his life.

He held a solo exhibition at Mexico City National Museum of Art in 1990 and participated in a "Very Special Arts" charity art event in 1993. He exhibited "the new Golf series", made in collaboration with Jack Nicklaus.

He was also a Production Designer for two Movies produced by his friend Franco Columbu. "Beretta's Island" (1992) and "Doublecross on Costa's Island" (1997). Both films were shot in the Island of Sardinia and Los Angeles.

In 1994, Yamagata began making a documentary film about the Beat Generation with Allen Ginsberg. He exhibited his painting on a vintage Mercedes-Benz car as a description of beauty of the nature, "Earthly Paradise," at Los Angeles Municipal Art Gallery. This piece was named by the art critic Sam Hunter. Glen Ginsberg wrote a description of the car as "Hiro Yamagata's spirit, the automobile of the 20th century" for the exhibition. (You can also see the process of making the Earthly Paradise on a movie director, Jonas Mekas's HP.) In this year, "Hiro Yamagata's all prints collection" was published. The Earthly Paradise exhibition was held in Hakone, Venice, Monte Carlo, Montecatini, and Tirino in 1995, Stockholm in 1996, Vienna in 1997 and Rome in 1998. In 1997, Yamagata held an exhibition, Element-A Laser Installation, at Fred Hoffman Fine Art Gallery. He showed a work from "Earthly Paradise" incorporated with laser for the décor of the Academy Awards Governor's Ball at the Oscars. In 1998, he had an exhibition of laser installation, Sculpture of Light, at the First St. Bridge in Los Angeles. In this year, Yamagata had an interview by NHK and made his first trip to China. In this trip, he produced a piece which was influenced by Taoism. Also, in this year, he began a piece themed for Japanese spirit, the Essence of Japan. He designed a set of 80-yen stamps, Omotya no Cha-cha-cha, issued by the Ministry of Posts and Telecommunications in Japan.

In 1999, Yamagata's American Lips exhibition was shown at Marlborough Gallery in New York. He also produced a movie which is related to the Beat Generation, a major feature documentary, The Source, and presented at Museum of Contemporary Art in Los Angeles and New York City. He held laser installation, Laumeier Lights at Laumeier Sculpture Park in St. Louis, Missouri. Also, he produced an official piece for the two hundredth anniversary of the White House foundation. In this year, he visited Tibet because of an interview of Asahi TV station. Then, he started creating the series of "Eternity of the Silk Road." Also, a PlayStation game which Hideki Tougi took charge of its music part, "YAMAGATA Digital Museum," was released.

=== 2000s ===
In 2000, Yamagata participated in a laser installation group exhibition, "An Active Life," at Contemporary Arts Center in Cincinnati, Ohio. In this year, he held "the Solar System Installations, Project 1" at Yamagata Studio in Malibu. He was designated as an official artist of Grammy Awards in 2000 by the Grammy foundation.

In 2001, Yamagata held a laser installation, "NGC6093" at Ace Gallery in New York. He held a laser installation, "Photon 999," at Guggenheim Museum Bilbao in Spain.

In 2002, Yamagata held an exhibition of laser installation, "Quantum Induction" at Pepperdine University. His exhibition at Ace, New York in 2002 was described as "stunning" by Art in America.

In 2003, Yamagata held an exhibition which was collaborated with NASA, "Art&SPACE exhibition-Hiro Yamagata and the world of NASA," at Yokohama Seaport. His piece in this exhibition was held indoors and made by laser reflection of innumerable cubes hanging from the ceiling of two huge cubic structures which was surrounded by holograms. Visitors at this exhibition put polarizing lenses on to see the piece. However, the exhibition was ended sooner that it should have been because of the number of visitors did not increase as much as expected. It was to say that people thought they would see Hiro Yamagata's print works in the exhibition; the description of this exhibition was not appropriate so that they were disappointed. Later on, Yamagata held a laser installation exhibition, "Super Nova 3" at COSI Columbus Science Museum in Ohio. Also, he participated in an event, the "300th anniversary of Sankt-Peterburg municipal government, a Night of Sound and light," to show his laser installation. In this year, he also held an exhibition, "Hiro Yamagata Original Pictures" in Okinawa.

In 2004, Yamagata held a laser installation, "Quantum Field X3" at Guggenheim Museum Bilbao, Spain. In this exhibition, the laser which was coming from a disk shaped object set upon a hill aside the museum reflected and lightened up two cubic buildings' walls surrounded by holograms which were set outside of the museum. Starting from the exhibition in Yokohama, Yamagata's world of laser installation began to expand in scale.

In 2005, Yamagata proposed a large-scale holographic recreation of the destroyed statue of the Buddha at the Archaeological Remains of the Bamiyan Valley, Afghanistan. The proposal included using solar energy saved during the day to power a laser installation after sunset, and was projected to cost $60,000,000. In this year, he showed his laser installation at a gala party which held at Geffen contemporary museum in L.A. Also, Yamagata participated in a collaboration event of laser installation and electrical music, "METTRIPPIN" and presented his work, "Theory Six." He also participated in the "Earth, Water, Fire and Air Festival" in the Castle in Cape Town, South Africa where he experimented in a pentagonal shaped castle, installed nearly 200 mirrors and reflected laser all around the building and the city. Also in 2005 he acted as executive producer for Sydney Pollack's documentary film Sketches of Frank Gehry, which was premiered at the Toronto Film Festival.

In 2006, Yamagata held an exhibition, "Air" at the Los Angeles Torrance Art Museum. Also, he held his installation, "Sculptor of Light," at Buschlen Mowatt Galleries in Palm Desert.

In 2007, Yamagata held an exhibition, "Transient" at Gehry Partners, in Los Angeles. The work consisted of India ink drawings on canvas.

== Honorary citizenships ==
- Honorary Citizen of the City of Warwick, Rhode Island
- Honorary Citizen of the City of Los Angeles
