= John Drewe =

British art forger (born 1948)

John Drewe (born 1948) is a British purveyor of art forgeries who commissioned artist John Myatt to paint them. Drewe earned about £1.8 million executing these art crimes.

== Early life ==
Drewe was born John Cockett in 1948 in Sussex, England. At the age of 17 he dropped out of school and changed his surname to Drewe. He worked briefly with the British Atomic Energy Authority, having initially convinced his superiors that he had a Ph.D. in physics. He resigned two years later, after this was found to be false. After that, there is a 15-year gap in official records about him — no employment or tax records.

According to Drewe himself, he joined the student protests in Paris in 1968, moved to West Germany and studied physics in the Kiel University. When he moved back to the UK, he taught experimental physics at the University of Sussex for a year and received a second degree in physics at SUNY Buffalo. None of those educational institutions have his name on their records.

In 1970 Drewe, claiming a PhD in physics, worked for a year as head of the Physics Department of Bexhill College in East Sussex.

In 1980, Drewe met wealthy Israeli expatriate Bat-Sheva Goudsmid and soon moved into her house, having charmed her with claims that he was an advisor to the Atomic Energy Authority, a British Aerospace board member, and worked for the Ministry of Defence. In fact, he was teaching physics in a Jewish private school in Highgate until he was apparently pressured to leave in 1985.

== Career as a forger ==
Also in 1985, Drewe met John Myatt, who was in dire need of money. First Drewe presented himself as a nuclear physicist who wanted art copies for his own home and hinted at links to British intelligence. Eventually he persuaded Myatt to paint forgeries for him. He used mud and vacuum cleaner dust to "age" them. Drewe contacted auction houses like Christie's and Sotheby's through intermediaries and sold about 200 of Myatt's paintings for £1.8 million. In the course of their many year relationship he gave Myatt a total of only £100,000 while he lived lavishly off the proceeds.

Drewe did not try to sell paintings in a vacuum but created false backgrounds for them. He forged certificates of authenticity and even invoices of previous sales to establish false provenance and paper trails for the paintings. He wrote to relatives of the artist to fool them into authenticating the forgeries. He tricked a small Catholic religious order in a village to sign a contract which would verify some of the paintings.

He also forged documents about previous owners so that the painting did not just suddenly seem to appear from nowhere. For this he used records of dead people, some of them his old acquaintances. He also convinced some of his living friends to sign documents as though they were previous owners of the paintings — most of them were broke or otherwise in trouble and accepted the money he offered them. To an old childhood friend, Daniel Stokes, he concocted a story about a drinking wife and needy children and convinced him to pretend to be an owner of a fake Ben Nicholson painting. Clive Bellman, another acquaintance, was told that the paintings were sold to provide money for purchases of archival materials from the Soviet Union about the Holocaust. When he could not find anyone to bribe, he just invented nonexistent people.

In 1989, Drewe gained access to the letter archives of the Institute of Contemporary Arts in London by claiming to be an interested collector. He also donated two paintings — Myatt's forgeries — for a fundraising auction. Later he used the institute's stationery in his fake documents. The Tate Gallery received a donation of two Roger Bissière paintings but Bissière's son did not accept them. Drewe withdrew the paintings but he made a donation of £20,000 (about US$32,000) to the gallery, so the gallery opened its archives to him. To become accepted by the Victoria and Albert Museum he needed a false reference — he provided one himself.

Drewe used the opportunity to introduce false records to the archives. He replaced old pages and inserted numerous new ones into old art catalogues to include Myatt's forgeries. The institutions have said that it will take years to purge the archives of all the false information. Through a middleman, Drewe also created a company called Art Research Associates and again used himself as a reference.

In 1995, Drewe left Goudsmid to marry Helen Sussman, a doctor. Goudsmid studied papers that Drewe had left behind and found a number of incriminating letters. She decided to tell the police and the Tate Gallery.

== 1995 arrest ==
In September 1995, Scotland Yard quietly arrested Myatt. He had fallen out with Drewe and agreed to cooperate. On 16 April 1996 police raided Drewe's house in Reigate, Surrey, and found materials he had used to forge certificates of authenticity. They also found two catalogues Drewe had stolen from the Victoria and Albert Museum. Police also found evidence that another artist in addition to Myatt might have supplied some of the forgeries.

During the interrogation, Drewe continuously protested his innocence against all evidence. He was released on bail and disappeared. Two months later police found him by following his mother.

This time, Drewe had concocted a conspiracy theory of frame-up. He claimed that he was an arms dealer and a fall guy for a conspiracy including British law enforcement and governments of seven countries and that there had been a total of 4,000 forgeries that had been used to finance arms deals between the UK arms industry and Iran, Iraq and Sierra Leone. He also claimed that he was a British intelligence agent, that Myatt was a neo-Nazi operative and that Robert Harris, a name mentioned in many forged certificates, was a South African arms dealer. He could not prove any of these stories.

If he had intended to scare police to drop the case, he failed. The prosecution declared his story pure fantasy and charged him.

The trial against Drewe and Myatt began in September 1998. Drewe fired his lawyer because he refused to use Drewe's story as a defence and decided to defend himself. Again he failed; Myatt called him a liar to his face and the jury declared him guilty in six hours.

On 13 February 1999 Drewe was sentenced to six years for conspiracy to defraud, two counts of forgery, one of theft, and one of using a false instrument with intent. He served two years in prison.

== Later criminal activity ==
In March 2012 at Norwich Crown Court, Drewe was convicted of defrauding a 71-year-old retired music teacher of her life savings of £700,000 and leaving her penniless. He was jailed for eight years by a judge who told him “In my view you are about the most dishonest and devious person I have ever dealt with".
