= Guy Hain =

French art forger

Guy Hain is a French art forger who produced number of fake bronze sculptures.

Guy Hain began as a seller of veterinary products. In his job he met a number of veterinarians who had antique bronze sculptures of animals and developed an interest in them. In 1962 he spent 550,000.00 French francs for Rodin's The Kiss. When he could not find a job as a salesman, he became an art dealer. He opened a gallery "Aux ducs de Bourgogne" in the Louvre des Antiquaires - a shopping mall not far from the Louvre that is leased mostly by antiques dealers. He closed the gallery in 1988.

Hain approached the foundry of Rudier that was one of the foundries that had produced Rodin's bronze sculptures at the beginning of the 20th century. He convinced the owners Georges and Bernard Rudier to use the original molds to recast known Rodin works. He set up a chasing shop in Nogent-sur-Marne and in 1990 bought the Balland foundry in Luxeuil-les-Bains and managed them with his wife.

Since the bronzes were based on the original moulds, the experts could not see the difference. Some of the bronzes were also made based on production plaster copies used 75–90 years previously.

Hain sold thousands of new bronzes to art dealers as originals, using the signature of Alexis Rudier, the original caster for Rodin. He earned equivalent to FFR 130 million ($18.2 million). He later claimed that he had a contract to use the name of Alexis but the Rudiers contested that.

He expanded to the production of copies from other sculptors like Antoine-Louis Barye, Alfred Barye, Jean-Baptiste Carpeaux, Camille Claudel, Christophe Fratin, Emmanuel Frémiet, Aristide Maillol, Pierre-Jules Mene and Pierre-Auguste Renoir. He practically flooded the art market with his copies.

In January 1992, police inspectors from Dijon, in Burgundy, arrested Hain and seized about twenty metric tons of bronze sculptures in various foundries in Burgundy and Paris.

On 17 January 1996 Hain appeared in court in Lure, central France, accused of forgery. On 28 June 1997 he was sentenced to four years in jail but served only 18 months.

The auctioneers Rey et Faure of Rambouillet were also charged with complicity for selling the bronzes of Hain in their auctions between 1987 and 1991. They had sold copies worth about $3 million. A big would-be-Rodin bronze called "The Kiss" was sold for Fr4.5 million (about US$800,000). Charges were later dropped.

Other auction houses such as Christie's and Sotheby's had also sold copies by Hain to their customers.

On 27 January 2006 a public auction organized by DNID (Direction Nationale d'Interventions Domaniales) was held in Dijon, France, with 73 bronzes in the exhibition. Five pieces were removed from the sale and 68 remained. "Angélique et Roger montés sur l'hippogriffe", "after" Antoine Barye, unmounted, sandcast bronze sculpture without inscription was adjudged €54,000. An original piece was sold for a record price of $310,000.00 at Christie's on 25 April 2003.

When Hain was released, he continued the practice: he had the bronzes produced in stages, one foundry doing the casting, one the chasing and one the patination. In 2000 he registered the names of Alexis and Georges Rudier - along with a number of other foundries - as trademarks he was wishing to be allowed to use. However, Georges Rudier sued him to get the names back.

Hain was rearrested in 2002 and appeared in court in April. Evidence collected by the Dijon police department included some 1,100 copies of the works of 98 different French sculptors. The prosecutor asked for five years in prison and a fine of two million Francs.

Many art dealers and collectors became very suspect of bronze works. Art expert Gilles Perrault calculated that Hain had produced over 6,000 copies beyond those the police had found and confiscated. Only one-third of the copies had been traced.
