= Ferdinand Erfmann =

Dutch painter (1901–1968)

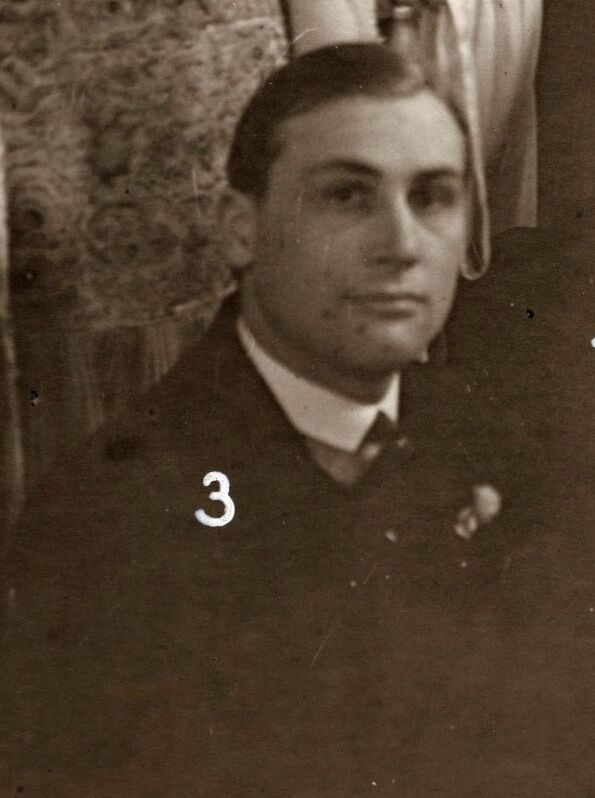
- Erfmann in 1926
- Born: 12 October 1901; Rotterdam
- Died: 28 July 1968 (aged 66); Sardinia
- Style: realism
- Movement: Dutch realism, De Onafhankelijken, New Objectivity

Ferdinand George Erfmann (Rotterdam, 12 October 1901 – Sardinia, 28 July 1968) was a Dutch painter, draftsman, actor and acrobat; best known for his figurative representations. In his visual work, he depicted static figures, often robust and androgynous: muscular women and men in drag.

== Life ==
He came from a theatrical family: both his parents, Eberhard Philip Erfmann and Mien Erfmann-Sasbach, and his sister Minny Erfmann were actors and Ferdinand was an acrobat in his youth.

He took lessons at the Quellinusschool, the National Institute for the Training of Drawing Teachers and the Rijksakademie van beeldende kunsten in Amsterdam. In 1929 he became a member of the artists' association De Onafhankelijken (The Independents) and was allowed to participate in a spring exhibition at the Stedelijk Museum.

He often worked as a painter at night, working side jobs during the day for a living. He frequently painted while dressing in women's clothes himself, capturing his ideal women he called "mastodons", and who were, in his own words 'manifestations that originate from myself'. This ideal was not shared by the society and his father, contributing to him remaining a bachelor.

Erfmann called his cross-dressing practice 'acrobatic transvestism', having several alter egos with names such as Yuri Tamaroff, Ephebe and Ferry Lodewicks (Lolita). They were photographed in 1958 by the Amsterdam photographer Henk Schmidt, commissioned so Erfmann could hang those portraits at his place. Even though it helped the artist with his depression and suicidality, he had to be evasive to the public about it, due to the societal stigma of gender variance at the time.

Erfmann traveled extensively, creating cityscapes from France, Italy, Albania, Spain, and Portugal.

Despite the artistic and financial success at the end of his life, Erfmann believed he remained "unsellable" and "unappreciated" as an artist. He drowned at sea during a vacation in Sardinia. The nature of his death was enigmatic, being considered suicide by some, accident by others (hypoglycemic diabetes episode or a heart attack) and murder by few.

In 1973 Stedelijk Museum Amsterdam organized an exhibition of his drawings and paintings.

== Style ==
Erfmann's style had similarities with the New Objectivity, a naive movement from the twenties in Germany. Despite having received training, he was called ‘The Netherlands’ best naive’ during the major revaluation of naïve realism in the 1960s. He called his work "psychic synthetic realism", contrasting it with "magical realism".

Erfmann was thematically inspired by the classics, the act of peeking and showing (frequently utilizing low vantage point and voyeurism), and gender differences and androgyny.
