= David Stein (art forger) =

David Stein (born Henri Haddad, January 27, 1935, Alexandria, Egypt – October 1999, Bordeaux, France) was an artist who, until 1966, had been frequently sentenced for theft by the French courts before becoming an art forger and art dealer with 15 aliases. Stein studied the artworks of Marc Chagall, Matisse, Braque, Paul Klee, Miró, Jean Cocteau and Rouault.

== Forgeries ==
In 1967, Marc Chagall notified authorities of forgeries of his work exhibited in a New York gallery, and Stein was arrested. Art dealers refused to cooperate with the prosecution because they thought that it would have made their expertise in the art field questionable. Stein was convicted of six counts of art forgery and grand larceny. During his prison term, Joseph Stone, the judge who arrested him, brought him to his office to paint. He remained a friend of the Stein family. In 1989, Stein still continued to make forgeries.

After Stein had served his prison term in the United States, he was deported to France, where he served another term. Prison authorities allowed him to make further paintings, although now using his own name. In 1969, a London gallery sold some of these paintings. After Stein was released, he sold his paintings under his own name.

== Later life ==
In the mid-1980s, director Gil Cates gave his agent Arthur Axelman at William Morris a copy of the book, which had been written without Stein's involvement. Axelman set out to find Stein, and after several years, he located him in Manhattan. Stein became an Axelman client and friend. Axelman introduced Stein to Keith Carradine and Alan Rudolph, director of the movie The Moderns, starring John Lone, Géraldine Chaplin, Keith Carradine and Linda Fiorentino. Stein appeared in the film as an art critic and provided all of the art.

Stein was living in France after the United States told him to leave US territory in 1988. He met the French photoreporter Stéphane Korb in 1981 in New York, and they became close friends. For 10 years, with the agreement of David Stein, he has been a confidant in Stein's photo archives and files about his personal life since 1981, including the story of the fake collages of Superman comics signed "Andy Warhol 1960". David Stein tried to escape a number of creditors after the series of Superman collages. According to The New York Times, in 1989, two comics experts discovered a series of fake collages in the Andy Warhol retrospective at the Museum of Modern Art. The same event happened in Paris three years later. Stein put four fake Superman collages in a public auction.

David Stein died in October 1999 in Bordeaux, France, from cancer. He had three children.
