= Heck, Dumfries and Galloway =

Coordinates: 55°06′25″N 03°25′05″W

Heck is a hamlet in the local government area of Dumfries and Galloway, Scotland.

Heck is 2 miles (3.2 km) southeast of the town of Lochmaben and is 1 mile (1.6 km) north of the village of Hightae.
