= Vicenç Caraltó =

Spanish painter

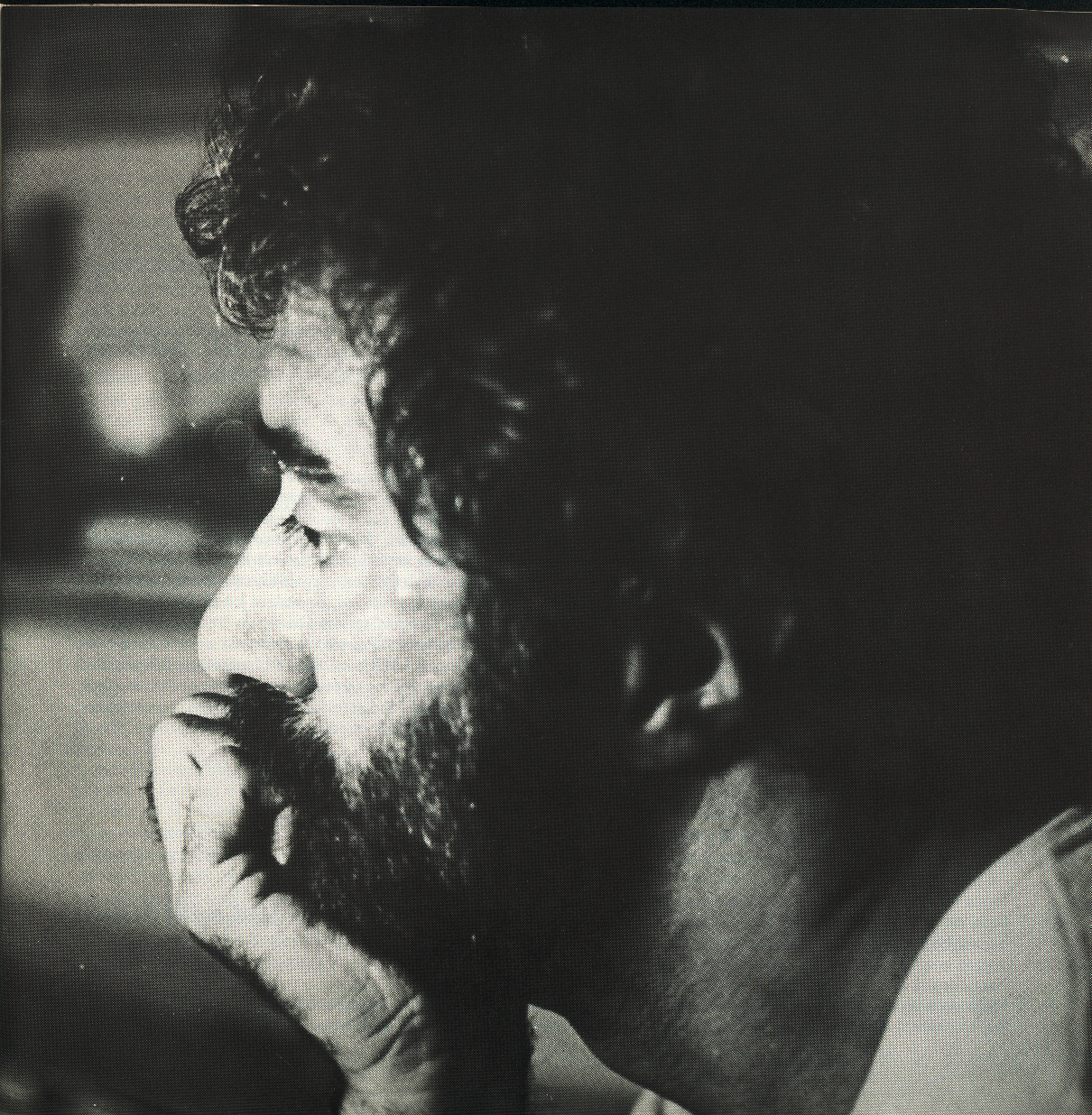
Vicenç Caraltó

Vicenç Caraltó i Salvà (Catalan pronunciation: [viˈsɛns kəɾəlˈto]; Barcelona 1939 – Barcelona 1995) was a Spanish Catalan painter, draftsman and engraver. His first work was shown in 1959.

His works were mainly based on the human body, using very precise drawing technique and excellent illustration, and influenced to a certain extent by Picasso as regards the expression of ideas and images of symbolic content. In his works as a designer, Caraltó displays a more decorative counterpoint. He also undertook illustrations for books and theater.

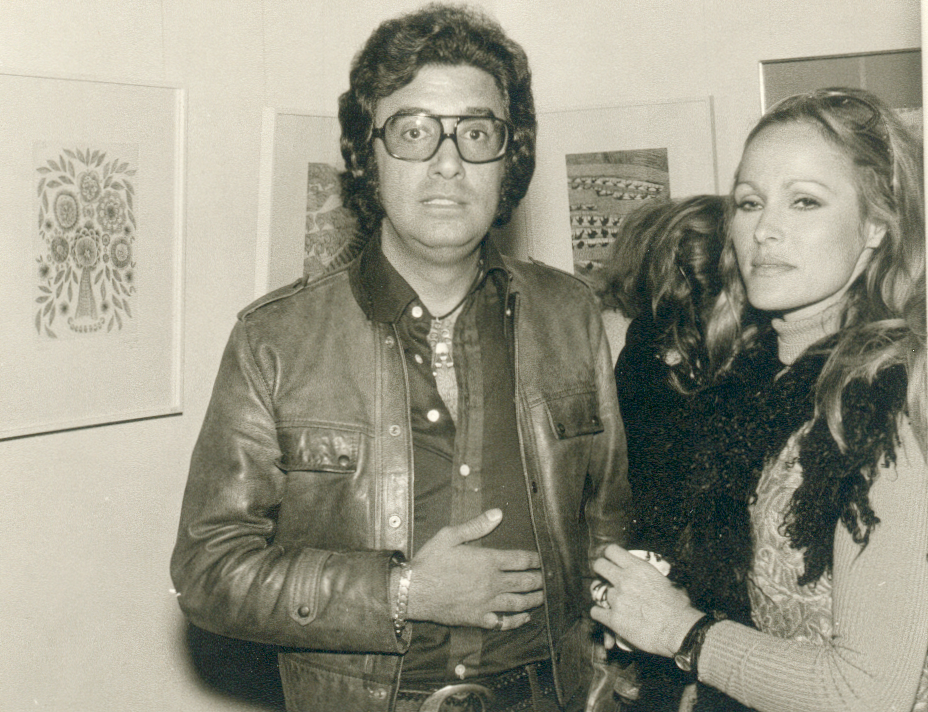
Ursula Andress and Vicenç Caraltó at the Elmyr de Ibiza art gallery
