= Fernand Legros =

French art dealer

Photograph of Legros

Fernand Legros (French: [ləɡʁo]; 26 January 1931 – 7 April 1983) was an art dealer who for over a decade, from the middle 1950s until the late 1960s, sold the forged artworks of Elmyr de Hory, an artist and "the Greatest Art Forger of Our Time" (taken from the title of Clifford Irving's biography of de Hory, "Fake!", published in 1969).

== Biography ==
Born on 26 January, 1931 in Ismaïlia in the Kingdom of Egypt to a French father and Greek mother, Legros first wished to be a ballet dancer. After World War II he moved from Cairo to Paris. Despite being homosexual, he married an American woman, possibly as a way of gaining US citizenship.

Legros met Elmyr de Hory, according to Irving, at a party given by de Hory in 1955 in New York City. Legros was introduced to de Hory by a mutual acquaintance, Dr. Josue Corcos.

Legros and de Hory's partnership began in earnest in Florida. Elmyr de Hory intended to live and work in Florida, as he had in previous years, and de Hory was persuaded to allow Legros to accompany him when de Hory left New York. In de Hory's words: "And then a week or so later we left New York together, in the Cadillac, for Florida. That was the beginning of everything."

While in Florida, de Hory met a French-Canadian teenager, Real Lessard. When Lessard was introduced to Legros, a relationship began which was both business and personal. It was often tumultuous. Over the next thirteen years, Elmyr de Hory produced artworks which were then sold by Legros and Lessard all over the world. While Legros and Lessard became wealthy, they kept de Hory on a small allowance to induce him to continue working. Eventually Legros built a house for de Hory on the island of Ibiza. "It was then, for the first time, that Elmyr began to suspect that his partners were becoming rich." Elmyr himself never accumulated capital nor ever became financially independent.

Legros fooled many art dealers, collectors and museums into buying forgeries, and the whereabout of most of the De Hory fakes is still unknown. His victims included US collector Algur H. Meadows of General American Oil Company. Eventually, however, his frauds were discovered. In 1967 the widow of Andre Derain question the authenticity of one of the forgeries and "two Dufys and a Vlaminck offered by Legros to the house were handed over to police". After a lengthy trial in Paris, Legros was sentenced to four years in prison but was immediately set free, having already spent an equivalent time in various jails.

Legros died of throat cancer in Chasseneuil-sur-Bonnieure on April 6,1983

== In popular culture ==
- Fernand Legros was the inspiration for the character Endaddine Akass in the unfinished Adventures of Tintin album Tintin and Alph-Art.
- Legros is depicted in Roger Peyrefitte's book Tableaux de Chasse.
