= William Blundell =

Australian painter and art copyist 1946-2023

William Blundell (1946 – 3 July 2023) was an Australian painter and art copyist. He painted copies, which he called innuendos, for Sydney art dealer Germaine Marie François Toussaint Curvers.

Blundell painted works with the style of, among others, Australian artists Charles Blackman, Arthur Boyd, William Dobell, Russell Drysdale, Sidney Nolan, Lloyd Rees, Arthur Streeton, Elioth Gruner, Brett Whiteley and also Claude Monet. According to Blundell, he sold them to Curvers as copies for decorative purposes only. He does not call them forgeries but "innuendos", works in the style of a specific artist. Many of the paintings were sold privately or at auction for up to $65,000. In an interview with Four Corners, Blundell claimed that he had painted at least 400 Whiteleys alone.

The forgeries were publicly exposed as a result of a dispute over Curvers' estate. Curvers had amassed a large private art collection, including an original E. Phillips Fox. Shortly before her death, Curvers dictated a new will to Blundell, appointing him executor, and leaving nothing to her husband and son. Curvers' husband, John, contested the will, and in the course of the estate investigation, summoned several art experts to examine the private collection because he doubted the authenticity of some of the paintings. As a result, John produced a list of nearly 200 works that he claimed were copies, stating that it was unknown to his late wife.

In court, Blundell confessed they were his works, but insisted that Germaine knew they were copies, stating 'She's six feet under now, so they will have to take my word for it'. Blundell said that the intention was that his paintings would be given away or sold for a nominal fee and that they would be used for decoration. He denies any intention to pass them as genuine to deceive collectors. Blundell stated that his early works were unsigned or contained clues that they were not originals, placing d'après in the hair of his figures to indicate that it was after not by the artist.

It has been pointed out that it was Germaine who made the greatest profit from the copies. The Sydney Morning Herald stated 'Her records, produced to the court, show that over 10 years she paid Blundell - always by cash or cash cheque - only about $40,000, typically $100 to $200 per painting. Her profits were extraordinary - often, just by adding an old $50 frame, she could make a 2,000 per cent profit.'

Germaine was nearly exposed in 1994 by a Paddington doctor who purchased 11 'Whiteleys' from her for $30,000. One art expert pronounced the works genuine and valued them at $85,000 for insurance purposes. However, two subsequent experts pointed out they were fakes, and the police were called in. Curvers refunded the money, and told reporters that she purchased them in good faith; therefore, no charges were laid.

Blundell later moved to Tasmania. He died in Penguin, Tasmania on 3 July 2023.
