= E. M. Washington =

American entrepreneur, printmaker, and engraver

Earl Marshawn Washington (born 1962) is an American entrepreneur, printmaker, woodcut artist and art forger.

== Activities ==
Beginning in 1998, woodcut prints from Washington began appearing on eBay and elsewhere; Washington claiming variously that the woodcuts were originals by famous artists, that they had been made by a great-grandfather whom he identified as named “Earl Mack Washington” and as having lived from 1862 until 1952, or that this alleged great-grandfather had rescued the associated blocks from a fire-bombed Manhattan print shop in the 1880s. E.M. Washington is an African American artist and reported his great-grandfather as such, which led to increased interest in the work. It was estimated by September 2004 that as many as 60,000 prints had been sold, at prices ranging from $20 to $350. (Washington himself has since admitted to “creating over 1700 wood engravings”.)

== Discovery ==
In 1999, not long after Washington's work began being sold, a Canadian collector and lawyer, Kenneth Martens, found that Washington had counterfeited work by Eric Gill. Unable to get eBay or other authorities to act, Martens created a website, “Washington Unmasked”, which began assembling and presenting evidence that Washington's work was counterfeit. The M.C. Escher Co. found that Washington was forging the work of M. C. Escher, pressed eBay into promising that it would forbid listing of these, and filed a complaint of criminal fraud in California, as prints were being handled there by stripper Stacy Ortiz (who would later become Washington's wife). Another collector was unable to find any census record for Earl Mack Washington; others failed to find corresponding Social Security records, or evidence in the records of artists with whom Earl Mack Washington had supposedly associated. An expert in art deco identified one of the images, duplicating work by Rockwell Kent, as necessarily dated more than twenty years after the supposed death of the supposed Earl Mack Washington.

A special exhibition of the work, scheduled for October 2004 at the Mid America Council Conference in Lincoln, Nebraska, was cancelled by the Amity Art Foundation after Washington both failed to produce proof that the work was other than his own and was discovered using advertisement for the exhibition to persuade others of the legitimacy of the work.

A criminal complaint was filed in Kalamazoo County, Michigan, by the owners of Prairie Home Antiques, who had purchased 82 prints from Washington for $1,640 on 17 June 2004.

One of Washington's former girlfriends, hairdresser Terra Zavala, provided Martens with a signed statement that she had witnessed Washington creating some of the woodcuts, and that Earl Marshawn Washington had admitted to her not knowing even the name of his great-grandfather. By 2004, Washington had admitted to creating some of the images, but insisted that he had not "misrepresented his own works as those of his great-grandfather".

Virtually all of the images appear to be copies and reinterpretative engravings of the work of other artists, available from books or other reprints, traced onto blocks. Some images have no significant modifications; in other cases the modifications result in absurdities, such as incongruous reflections and German words turned into nonsense. Many of Washington's M.C. Escher forgeries are strikingly similar to the originals but are the wrong size. These include the works Lute, Man with Cuboid, Six Birds, Thirteen Flying Fish, Letter H, Letter A, Spherical Self Portrait, Retreat, Candle, Frog, Dice, Scales, Anvil, Watering Can, Devil Vignette, and Fish and Frogs.

== Sentencing for mail and wire fraud conspiracy ==
Following a plea arrangement that vacated broader charges, Washington and his wife, Zsanett Nagy, pleaded guilty to conspiracy to commit wire fraud and mail fraud (and in Nagy's case, to money laundering); after they each admitted selling inauthentic woodblocks and prints made from them, items advertised as being from the 15th to early 20th centuries, Nagy was sentenced to time served (with potential for deportation, January 2024), and Washington was sentenced to 52 months in prison, and ordered to serve 3-years of supervised release after it, and to pay more than US$ 203,000 in restitution to victims (April 2024). In one set of transactions covered by the cases, a collector paid approximately US $119,000 from 2013 to 2016 to Washington and a former girlfriend working under their alias, "River Seine", for approximately 130 woodblocks advertised as being centuries old.
