= Heck: Where the Bad Kids Go =

Book by Dale E. Basye

- Author: Dale E. Basye
- Illustrator: Bob Dob
- Series: Circles of Heck
- Publisher: Random House, Yearling
- Publication date: July 22, 2008
- Publication place: United States
- Media type: Hardcover
- Pages: 304
- ISBN: 978-0-375-84075-3
- OCLC: 122308983
- Followed by: Rapacia: The Second Circle of Heck

Heck: Where the Bad Kids Go is a 2008 juvenile novel by Dale E. Basye, with jacket and interior illustrations by Bob Dob. It is published by Random House. The books feature many puns and allusions. It is the first volume of a proposed nine-book series, eight of which have been released as of 2019.

== Plot summary ==
One day, nerdy 11-year old Milton Fauster and his kleptomaniac 13-year-old sister Marlo are in the Grizzly Mall of Generica, Kansas. They go into a store where Marlo shoplifts some lip gloss, which she surreptitiously stashes in Milton's backpack without his knowledge. A mall security officer spots this, and tries to accost the two.

As Marlo and Milton are running through the mall with the security guard chasing them, Milton realizes Marlo tricked him into being an accomplice. Pausing for a moment in front of a giant marshmallow statue of a Grizzly Bear, and Milton spots Damian Ruffino, his extremely unhygienic tormentor, school bully, and all -around delinquent, sticking dynamite in the marshmallow grizzly's behind.

Before the mall security guards can catch up with them, the marshmallow grizzly bear explodes prematurely, and Milton, Marlo, and Damian all die. The last thing they see is flaming marshmallow all over the mall. The next thing they know, Milton and Marlo are holding hands and plummeting downward and Milton feels a slight sting. When he and Marlo land, they find themselves in Limbo, the waiting area for the Nine Circles of Heck, which include Rapacia, Blimpo, Fibble, Snivel, Precocia, Lipptor (Wise Acres), Sadia, and Dupli-City. Because of her sins (e.g., the shoplifting) Marlo has been sent to a sort of "lite" version of Hell reserved for bad kids, called "Heck"; Milton, apparently, has been judged guilty by association and sent there with his sister.

Processed through the afterlife's hellish bureaucracy, Marlo and Milton are conveyed to a nightmare of a school in Heck, presided over by principal Bea "Elsa" Bubb, who torments her charges with pretty much the worse things they can imagine in a school. Milton and Marlo are separated and Milton meets Virgil, who befriends him, and the two plot an escape from heck and return to Earth and the land of the living. But Damien, who has been bad enough that he has started to rise in the hierarchy of Heck, is sent after them and foils their plans, landing them back in Heck. Marlo, meanwhile, has been causing her own brand of chaos by organizing a resistance among the girls in the heckish school, causing Principal Bubb to decide that the Fauster siblings are problem children. She decides to deal with them by sending them to the next lower circle of Heck: Rapacia.

Each book in the series deals with a different realm of the afterlife of Heck, loosely modeled on Dante's Nine Circles of Hell.

== Cultural satire ==
The book is rife with double meanings and puns which often operate on two levels simultaneously: humor for children and satire for adults. In this regard the series has similarities with the 1960 television cartoon show, The Adventures of Rocky and Bullwinkle and Friends, which contained humor geared towards kids interlaced with political satire that would likely go over their heads, but be readily perceived by their parents.

The names of the characters, for example, are derived from writers of, or characters in famous literary works dealing with concepts of Heaven and Hell:

- "Fauster", from Faust, a legendary German character who sells his soul to the Devil
- "Marlo", from Christopher Marlowe, Elizabethan author of a play about the Faust character
- "Milton", from John Milton, 17th century author of the epic poem Paradise Lost, about the Fall of Man and the temptations of Satan
- "Bee "Elsa" Bubb", from Beelzebub, one of the princes of Hell, in Abrahamic tradition
- "The Nine Circles" concept is taken from the Inferno part of the trilogy The Divine Comedy, by Middle Ages author Dante Alighieri, in which he meticulously describes the "Nine Circles of Hell".

There are many others.

Along with the literary references are a great number of more contemporary—mostly ironic—cultural references. Classes in Heck's school, for example, include home-economics with Lizzie Borden (accused of axe-murdering her parents); an ethics class taught by Richard Nixon (who left the US Presidency in disgrace after being linked to a cover-up of a politically motivated burglary); and a gym class run by Blackbeard, the notorious pirate captain of the West Indies from the late 17th-early 18th centuries.

== Reception ==
The book has received favorable reviews, and was nominated for an Oregon "Reader's Choice" award. and the second book in the series, Rapacia: The Second Circle of Heck was nominated for an Oregon Book Award.

"Parents and readers ages 9-13 who don't mind theological liberties being taken with the hereafter are in for a treat with Dale E. Basye's very funny debut novel."

"In this entertaining tale, style counts for more than plot, but readers will nonetheless cheer when Milton -- rather than being demoralized by the ghastly 1970s tunes piped into the hellish Heck -- is inspired by one of them to stage the most daring breakout in ... eternity."

"The author's umpteen clever allusions—-characters' eternal fates are decided by standardized 'Soul Aptitude Tests'; Mr. R. Nixon teaches ethics to evildoers in room 1972—make this book truly sparkle."

== Subsequent books in the series ==
- Rapacia: The Second Circle of Heck was released in July, 2009.
- Blimpo: The Third Circle of Heck was released in May, 2010.
- Fibble: The Fourth Circle of Heck was released May, 2011.
- Snivel: The Fifth Circle of Heck was released on May 22, 2012.
- Precocia: The Sixth Circle of Heck was released in February 2013.
- Wise Acres: The Seventh Circle of Heck was released on December 24, 2013.
- Sadia: The Eighth Circle of Heck was released on December 16, 2017.
- Dupli-City: The Ninth Circle of Heck (not yet released)

== See also ==
- Faust
- Dante's Inferno
- Paradise Lost
