= Paul Quinsac =

French painter

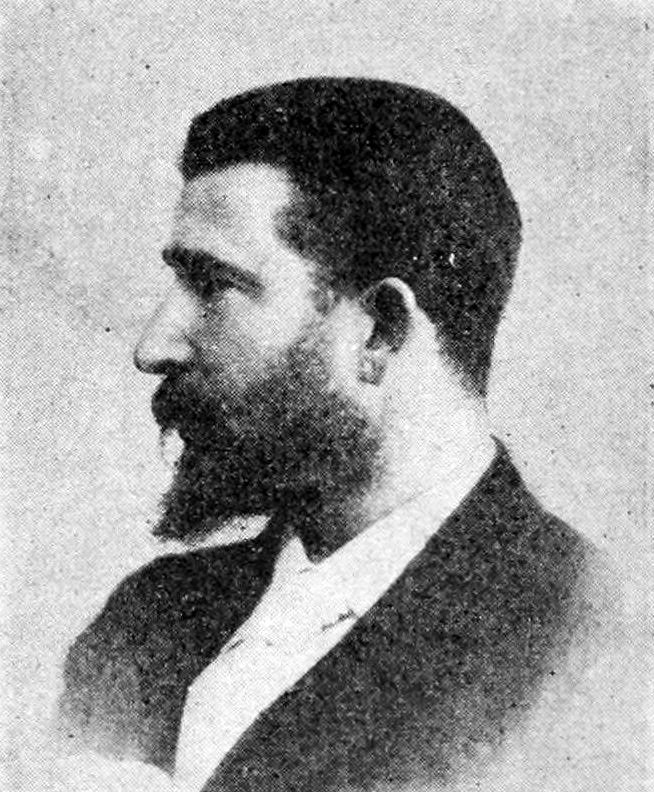
Paul Quinsac

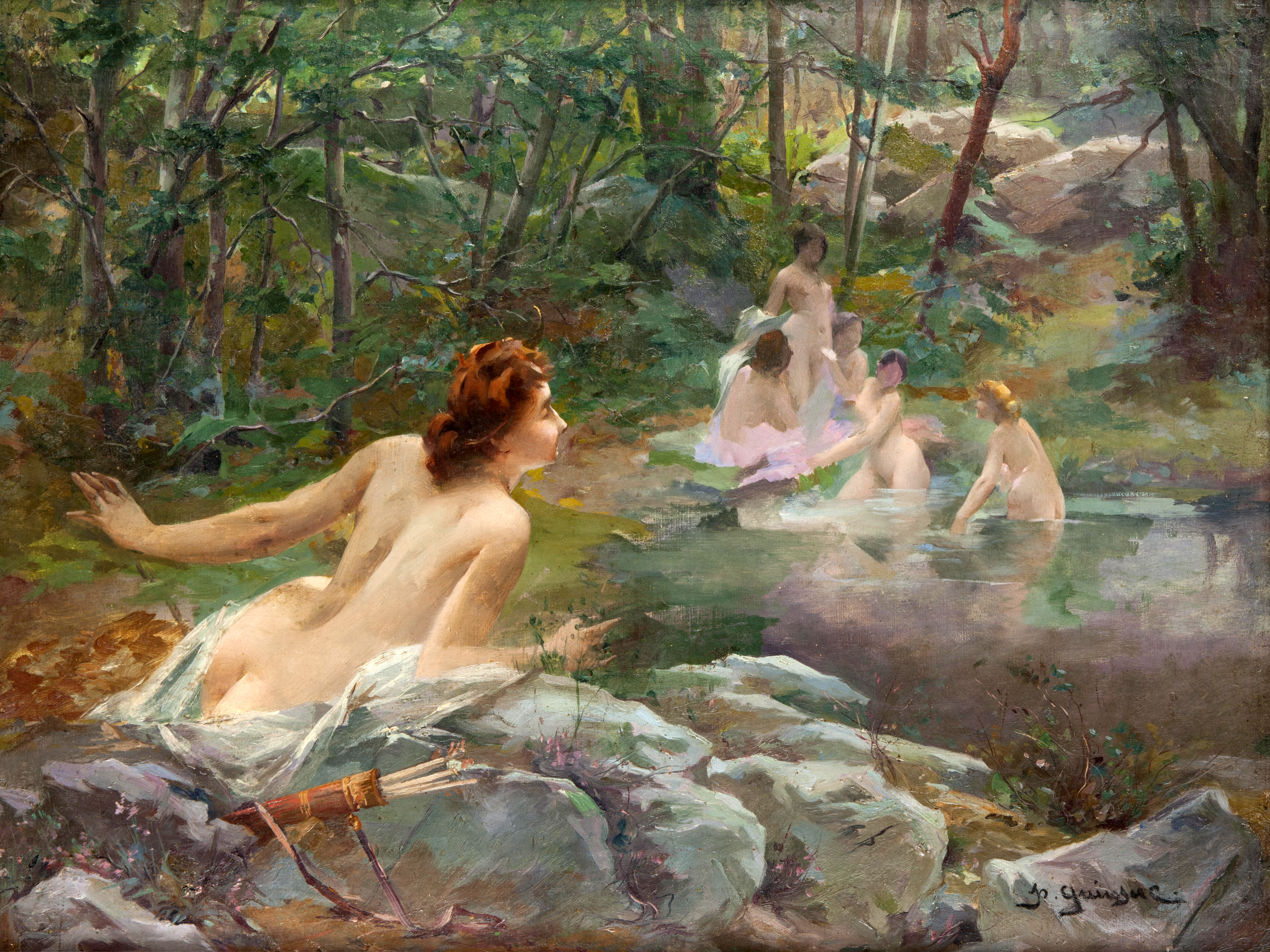
Nymphs in the Forest

François Paul Auguste Quinsac (2 March 1858 – May 1929) was a French painter.

Quinsac was born in Bordeaux. He was a painter of the French School known as Academic art, a specialist in mythological and allegorical subjects, figures and landscapes. He studied with Jean-Léon Gérôme and later he became professor at the School of Fine Arts of Bordeaux (École des beaux-arts de Bordeaux).

From 1880 he exhibited regularly to the Hall of the French Artists of which he became a member in 1887. He received an honourable mention during the exhibition of 1884, a medal of third class to the World Fair of 1889, as well as a travel grant. He was named Chevalier de la légion d’Honneur in 1903. He died in Bordeaux in May 1929, aged 71.
