= Archaeological forgery =

Manufacture of supposedly ancient items

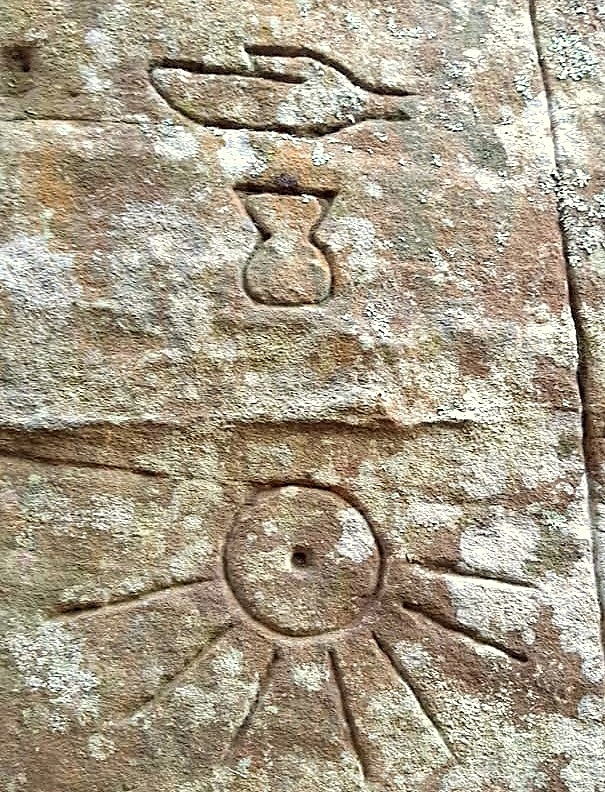
The Gosford Glyphs, a set of forged Egyptian-style hieroglyphs in Australia

Archaeological forgery is the manufacture of supposedly ancient items that are sold to the antiquities market and may even end up in the collections of museums. It is related to art forgery, and can overlap for certain periods.

A string of archaeological forgeries have usually followed news of prominent archaeological excavations. Historically, famous excavations like those in Crete, the Valley of the Kings in Egypt and Pompeii have caused the appearance of a number of forgeries supposedly spirited away from the dig. Those have been usually presented in the open market but some have also ended up in museum collections and as objects of serious historical study.

In recent times, forgeries of pre-Columbian pottery from South America have been very common. Other popular examples include Ancient Egyptian earthenware and supposed ancient Greek cheese. There have also been paleontological forgeries like the archaeoraptor or the Piltdown Man skull.

== Motivations ==
Most archaeological forgeries are made for reasons similar to art forgeries – for financial gain. The monetary value of an item that is thought to be thousands of years old is higher than if the item were sold as a souvenir.

However, archaeological or paleontological forgers may have other motives; they may try to manufacture proof for their point of view or favorite theory (or against a point of view/theory they dislike), or to gain increased fame and prestige for themselves. If the intention is to create "proof" for religious history, it is considered pious fraud.

== Detection ==
Investigators of archaeological forgery rely on the tools of archaeology in general. Since the age of the object is usually the most significant detail, they try to use radiocarbon dating or neutron activation analysis to find out the real age of the object.

== Criticisms of antiquities trade ==
Some historians and archaeologists have strongly criticized the antiquities trade for putting profit and art collecting before scientific accuracy and veracity. This, in effect, favours archaeological forgeries. Allegedly, some of the items in prominent museum collections are of dubious or at least of unknown origin. Looters who rob archaeologically important places and supply the antiquities market are rarely concerned with exact dating and placement of the items. Antiquities dealers may also embellish a genuine item to make it more saleable. Sometimes traders may even sell items that are attributed to nonexistent cultures.

As is the case with art forgery, scholars and experts don't always agree on the authenticity of particular finds. Sometimes an entire research topic of a scholar may be based on finds that are later suspected as forgeries.

== List ==
=== Known archaeological forgers ===
- Curzio Inghirami (1614—1655), 17th century Italian archaeologist and historian known as a forger of Etruscan artifacts
- Edward Simpson (b. 1815, fl. 1874), Victorian English forger of prehistoric flint tools. He sold forgeries to many British museums, including the Yorkshire Museum and the British Museum
- Moses Wilhelm Shapira (1830–1884), Ukrainian purveyor of fake biblical artifacts
- Alois Anton Führer (1853-1930), German indologist who forged many inscriptions
- Alceo Dossena (1878–1937), 19th century Italian creator of many Archaic and Medieval statues
- James Mellaart (1925–2012), English archaeologist and author who is noted for his discovery of the Neolithic settlement of Çatalhöyük in Turkey. After his death, it was discovered that he had forged many of his "finds", including murals and inscriptions used to discover the Çatalhöyük site.
- Tjerk Vermaning (1929–1986), Dutch amateur archaeologist whose Middle Paleolithic finds were declared forgeries
- Brigido Lara (b. 1939-1940), Mexican forger of pre-Columbian antiquities
- Shinichi Fujimura (b. 1950), Japanese amateur archeologist who planted specimens on false layers to gain more prestige
- Shaun Greenhalgh (b. 1961), a prolific and versatile British forger, who, with the help of his family, forged Ancient Egyptian statues, Roman silverware and Celtic gold jewelry among more modern artworks. Arrested in 2006 attempting to sell three Assyrian reliefs to the British Museum.

=== Known archaeological forgeries and hoaxes ===
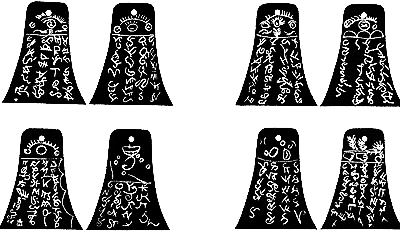
The engraved Kinderhook plates, buried and then excavated at a mound in Illinois in the United States

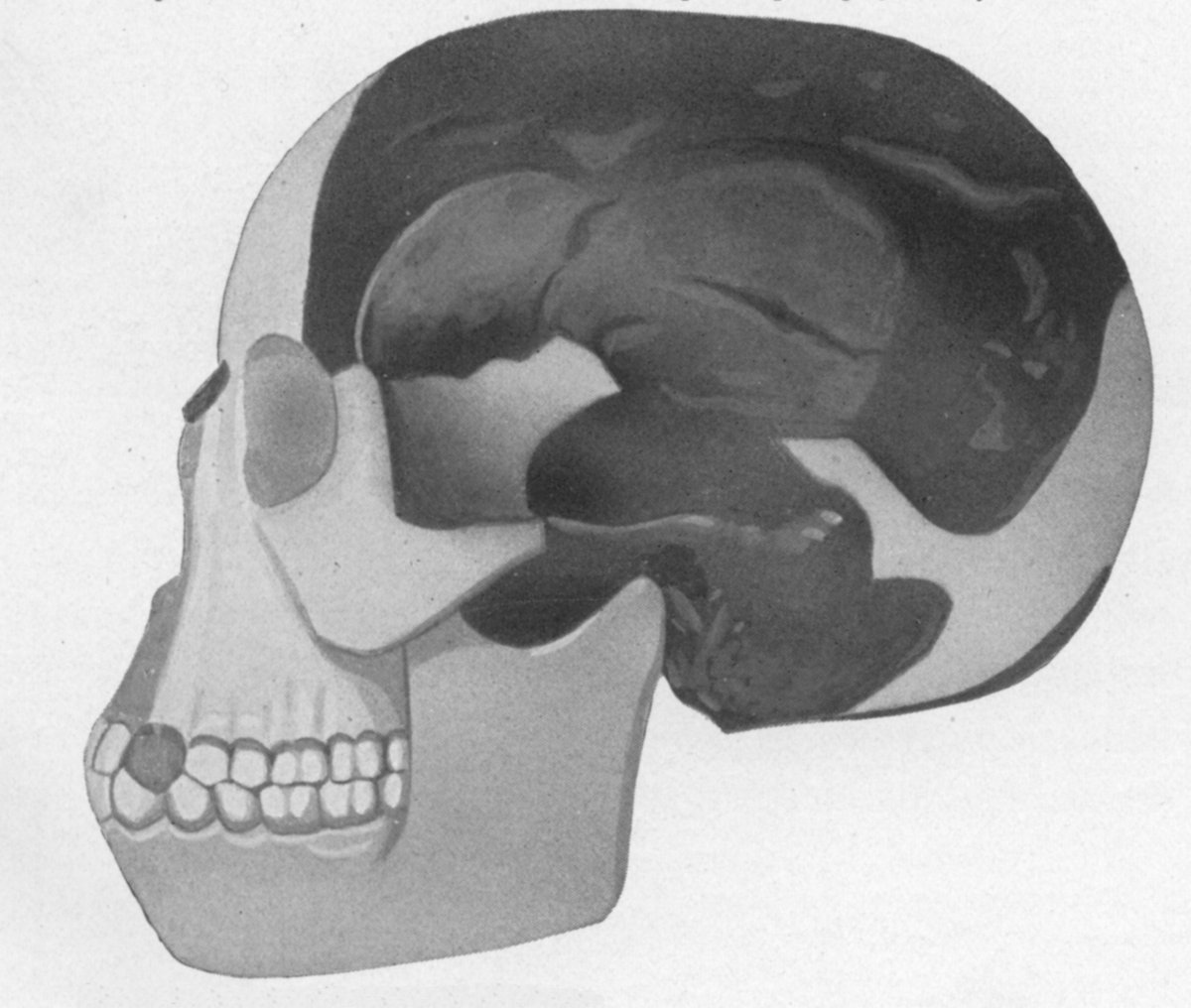
The Piltdown Man skull, a famous palaeoanthropological hoax

- Grave Creek Stone, "discovered" in 1838
- Kinderhook plates, "discovered" in 1843
- Calaveras Skull ("discovered" 1866), purported to prove that humans lived in North America as early as the Pliocene Epoch (5.33–2.58 MYA)
- Cardiff Giant ("discovered" 1869), carved gypsum statue presented as a petrified man, over 10 feet (3.0 m) tall
- Davenport Tablets (discovered 1877–1878), ornately carved slate tablets of purported Native American origin, but dubious authenticity
- Michigan Relics, "discovered" in 1890
- Tiara of Saitaferne in Louvre, which announced its acquisition in 1896
- "Egyptian mummy" ca. 1898, purchased from the estate of Confederate Colonel Breevoort Butler in the 1920s, the "mummy" was found to be a wooden frame covered with papier-mache; it is on display at the Old Capitol Museum in Jackson, Mississippi with its true nature openly revealed
- Piltdown Man, "discovered" in 1912
- Tucson artifacts, "discovered" in 1924, thirty-one lead objects that Charles E. Manier and his family found near Picture Rocks, Arizona, which were initially thought by some to be created by early Mediterranean civilizations that had crossed the Atlantic in the first century, but were later determined to be a hoax.
- Etruscan terracotta warriors purchased by New York's Metropolitan Museum of Art from 1915 to 1921; announced as forgeries in 1961
- Drake's Plate of Brass (discovered 1936), purported to have been left by Francis Drake after landing in Northern California in 1579
- Venus de Brizet, sculpted and buried by the artist in 1936; "discovered" in 1937
- Ica stones (created and sold in the 1960s), depict Inca dinosaur-hunters, surgery, and other modern or fanciful topics. Collected by Javier Cabrera Darquea, who claimed them to be prehistoric. Later revealed to be a forgery created by a local farmer.
- Japanese Paleolithic hoax, starting in the 1970s
- Persian Princess, forged ancient mummy, possible murder victim, found in 2000
- Two arrowheads from South Shetland Islands, planted to convince scientists that indigenous peoples of the Americas once crossed the Drake Passage.

=== Cases generally believed by professional archaeologists to be forgeries or hoaxes ===
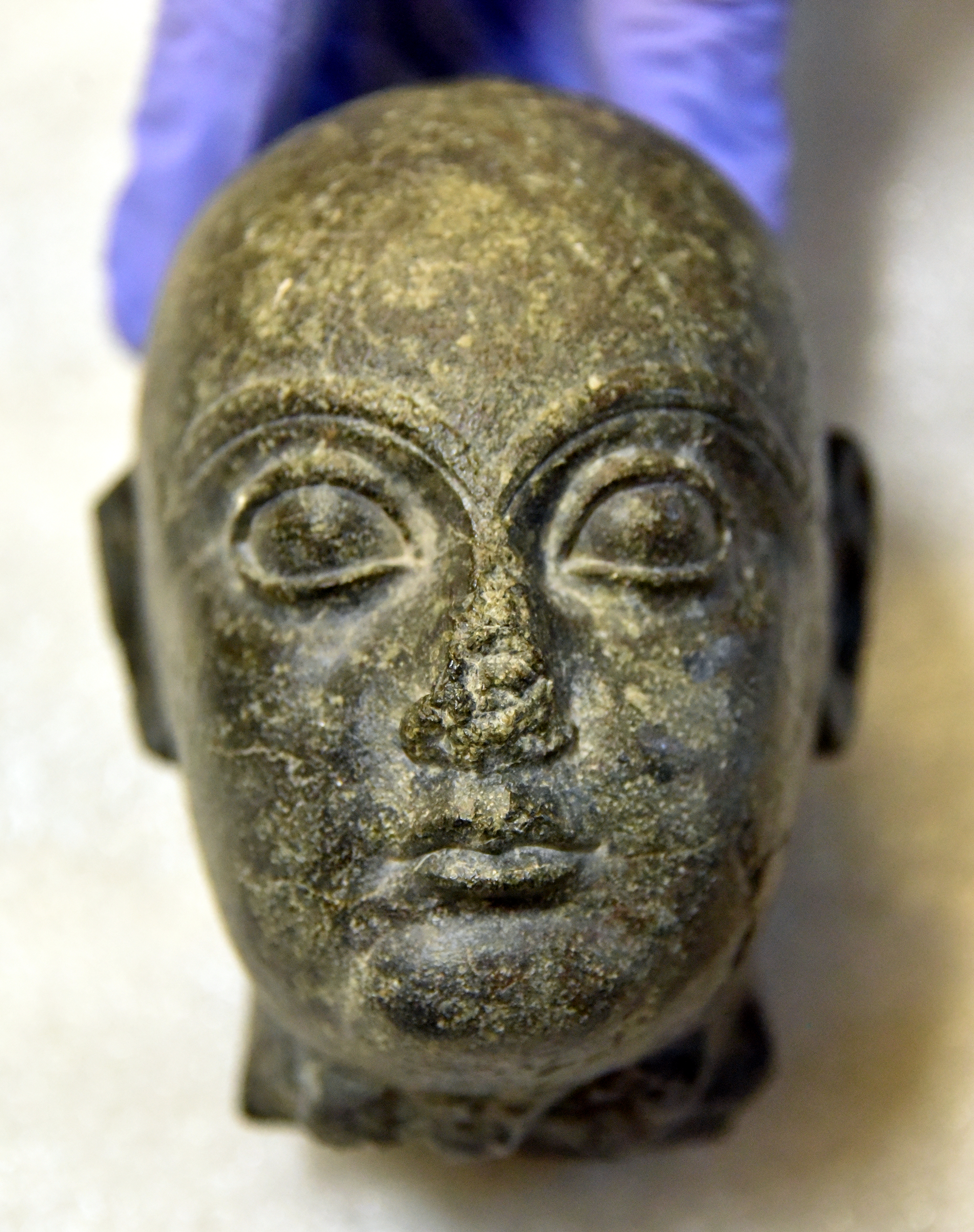
Head of Gudea, ruler of Lagash, a Confiscated forgery; head of the Sumerian ruler Gudea. Sold as a genuine ancient Mesopotamian piece and now held at the Sulaymaniyah Museum, Iraq.

- America's Stonehenge
- Bat Creek inscription
- Bourne Stone
- Burrows Cave
- Crystal skulls, claimed to be Pre-Columbian Mesoamerican, but now believed to be modern
- Los Lunas Decalogue Stone
- Newark Holy Stones: Keystone tablet and the Newark Decalogue Stone
- Walam Olum
- Kensington Runestone
- Acámbaro figures (discovered in 1944), figurines of dinosaurs, attributed by Waldemar Julsrud to an ancient society.
- Gosford Glyphs (discovered in the 1970s), Egyptian hieroglyphs carved into a pair of sandstone walls in New South Wales, Australia; widely acknowledged as modern forgeries, a minority of scholars use the glyphs as evidence of ancient Egyptian contact with Australia

=== Cases that several professional archaeologists believe to be forgeries or hoaxes ===
- James Ossuary
- Jehoash Inscription
- Ivory pomegranate
- Wallace Sword
- Ring of Nestor
- The pieces discovered in 2005-2006 in Iruña-Veleia
- Mausoleum of Tangun
- Vérité kiʻi (auctioned 2017), a Hawaiian kiʻi cataloged as c. 1780–1820, which several specialists in Oceanic art have argued is a later imitation

=== Cases that some professional archaeologists believe to be forgeries or hoaxes ===
- Phaistos disc
- Gabriel's Revelation
- Cascajal Block
- Mask of Agamemnon
- Glozel tablets (archeological site discovered 1924), set of 100 inscribed ceramic tablets found in an authentic Medieval site among other artifacts of mixed authenticity and period

== See also ==
- Literary forgery
- Nebra sky disk
- Outline of forgery
- Pious forgery
- Scientific misconduct
