= 2000 =

2000 in various calendars
- Gregorian calendar: 2000; MM
- Ab urbe condita: 2753
- Armenian calendar: 1449; ԹՎ ՌՆԽԹ
- Assyrian calendar: 6750
- Baháʼí calendar: 156–157
- Balinese saka calendar: 1921–1922
- Bengali calendar: 1406–1407
- Berber calendar: 2950
- British Regnal year: 48 Eliz. 2 – 49 Eliz. 2
- Buddhist calendar: 2544
- Burmese calendar: 1362
- Byzantine calendar: 7508–7509
- Chinese calendar: 己卯年 (Earth Rabbit); 4697 or 4490 — to — 庚辰年 (Metal Dragon); 4698 or 4491
- Coptic calendar: 1716–1717
- Discordian calendar: 3166
- Ethiopian calendar: 1992–1993
- Hebrew calendar: 5760–5761
- Hindu calendars
- Vikram Samvat: 2056–2057
- Shaka Samvat: 1921–1922
- Kali Yuga: 5100–5101
- Holocene calendar: 12000
- Igbo calendar: 1000–1001
- Iranian calendar: 1378–1379
- Islamic calendar: 1420–1421
- Japanese calendar: Heisei 12 (平成１２年)
- Javanese calendar: 1932–1933
- Juche calendar: 89
- Julian calendar: Gregorian minus 13 days
- Korean calendar: 4333
- Minguo calendar: ROC 89 民國89年
- Nanakshahi calendar: 532
- Thai solar calendar: 2543
- Tibetan calendar: ས་མོ་ཡོས་ལོ་ (female Earth-Hare); 2126 or 1745 or 973 — to — ལྕགས་ཕོ་འབྲུག་ལོ་ (male Iron-Dragon); 2127 or 1746 or 974
- Unix time: 946684800 – 978307199

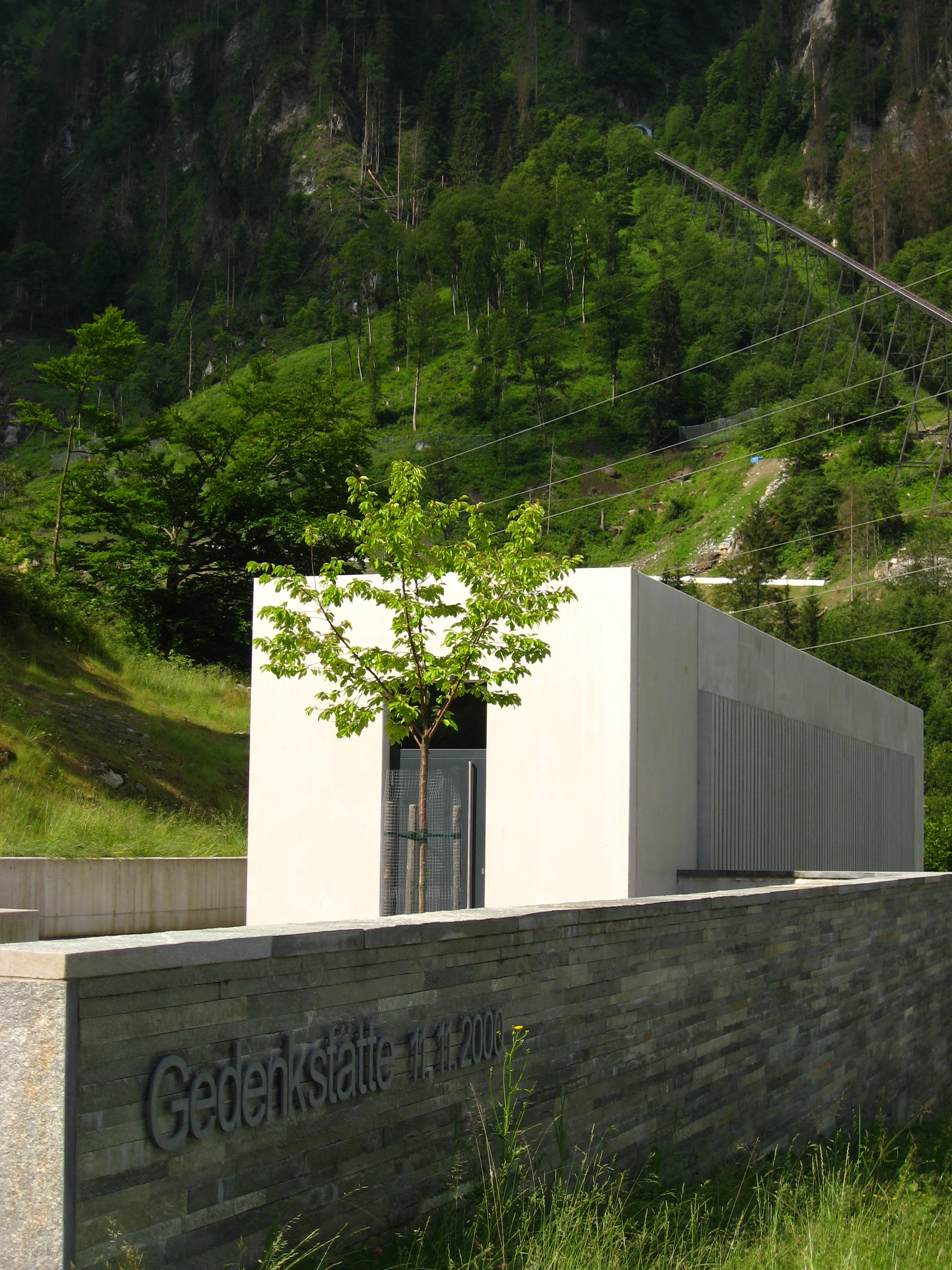
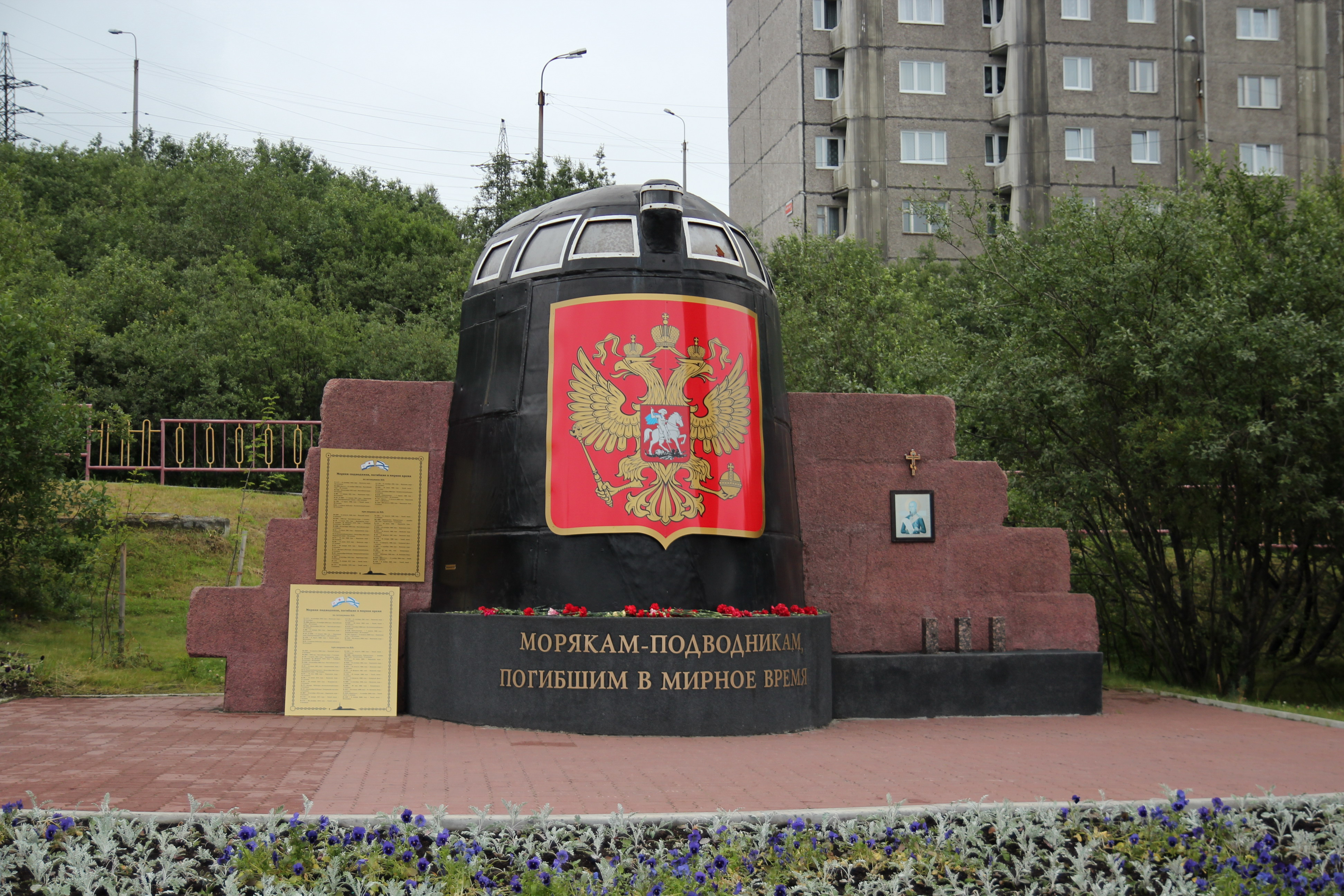
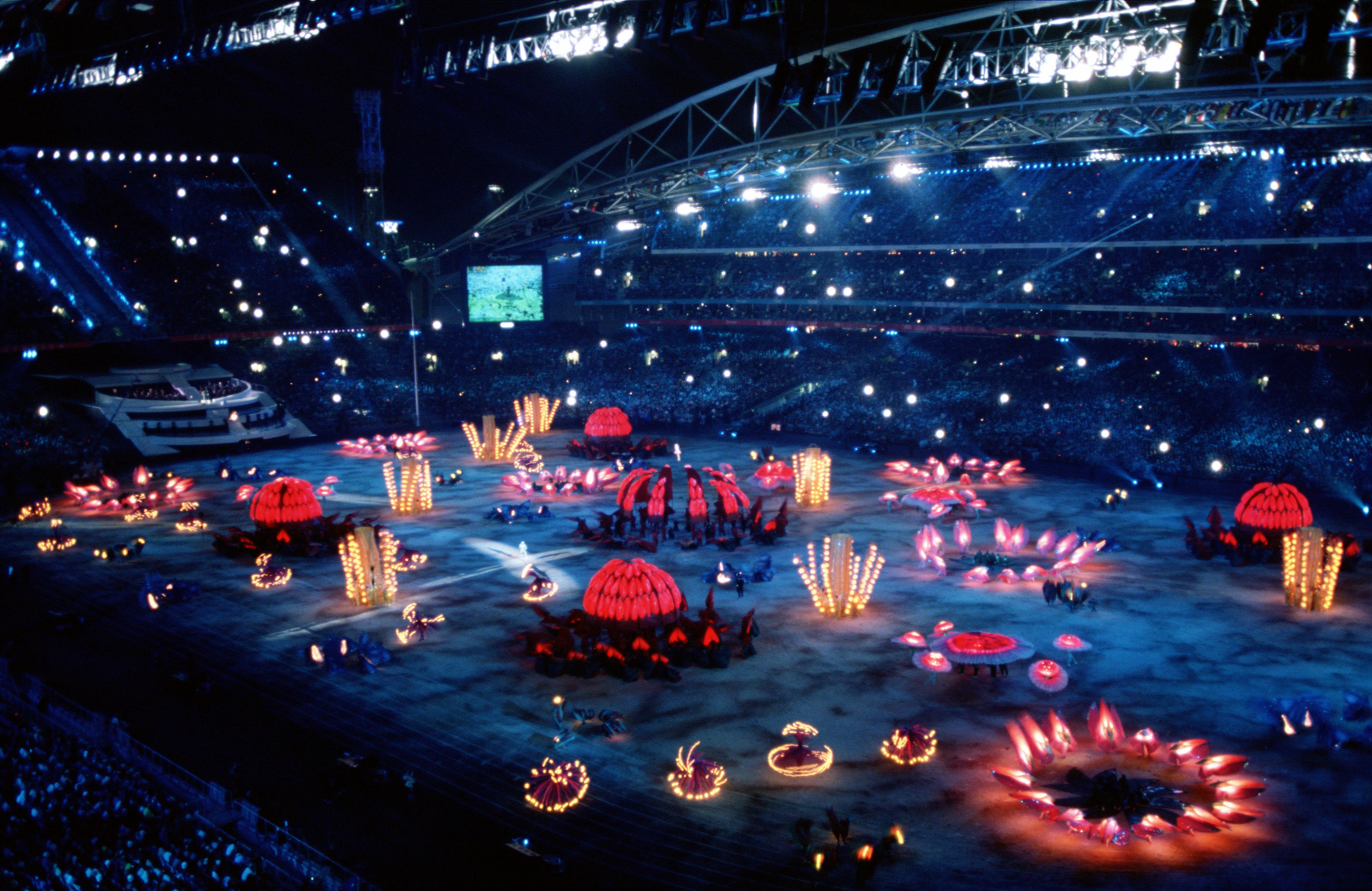
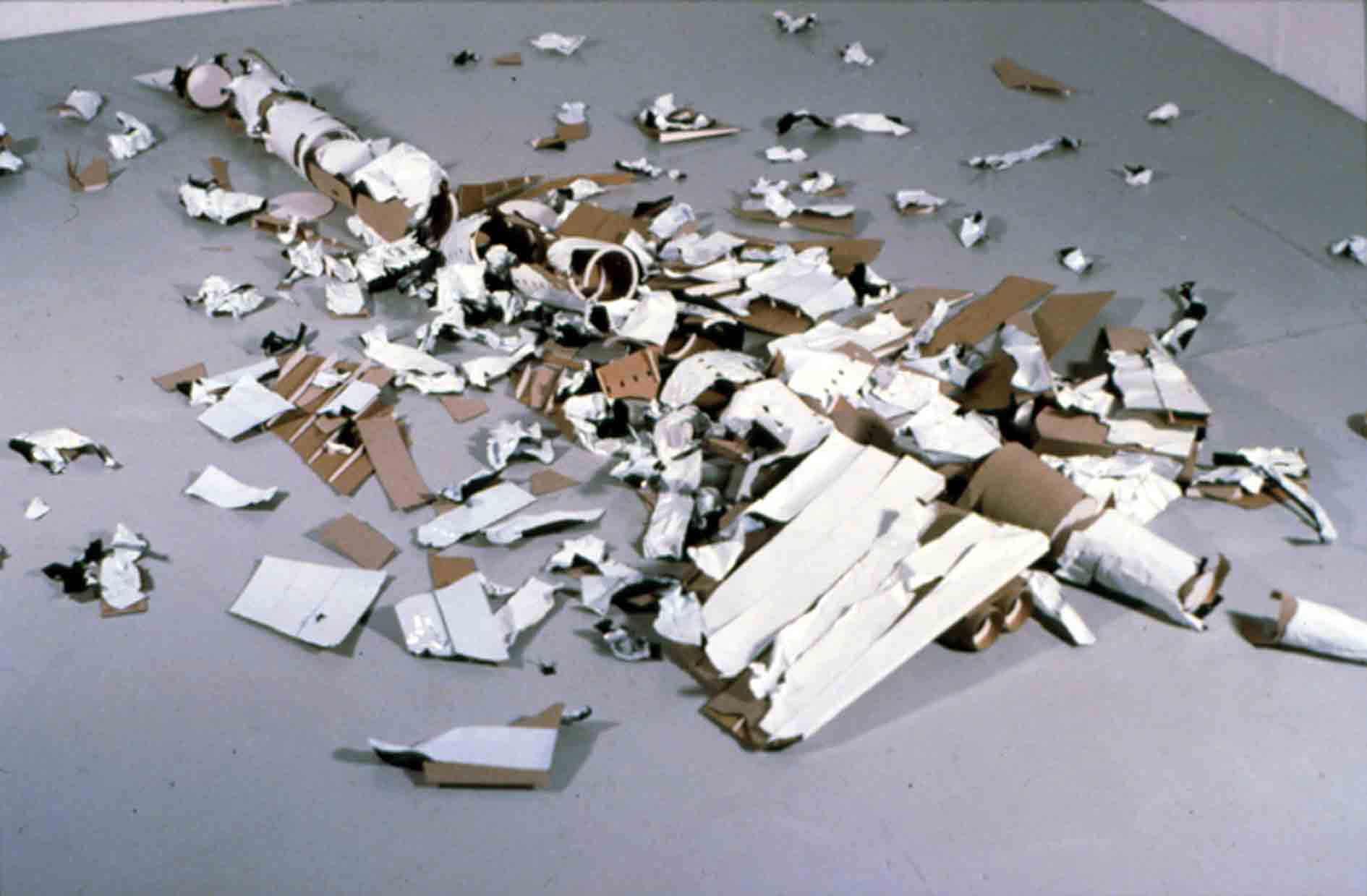
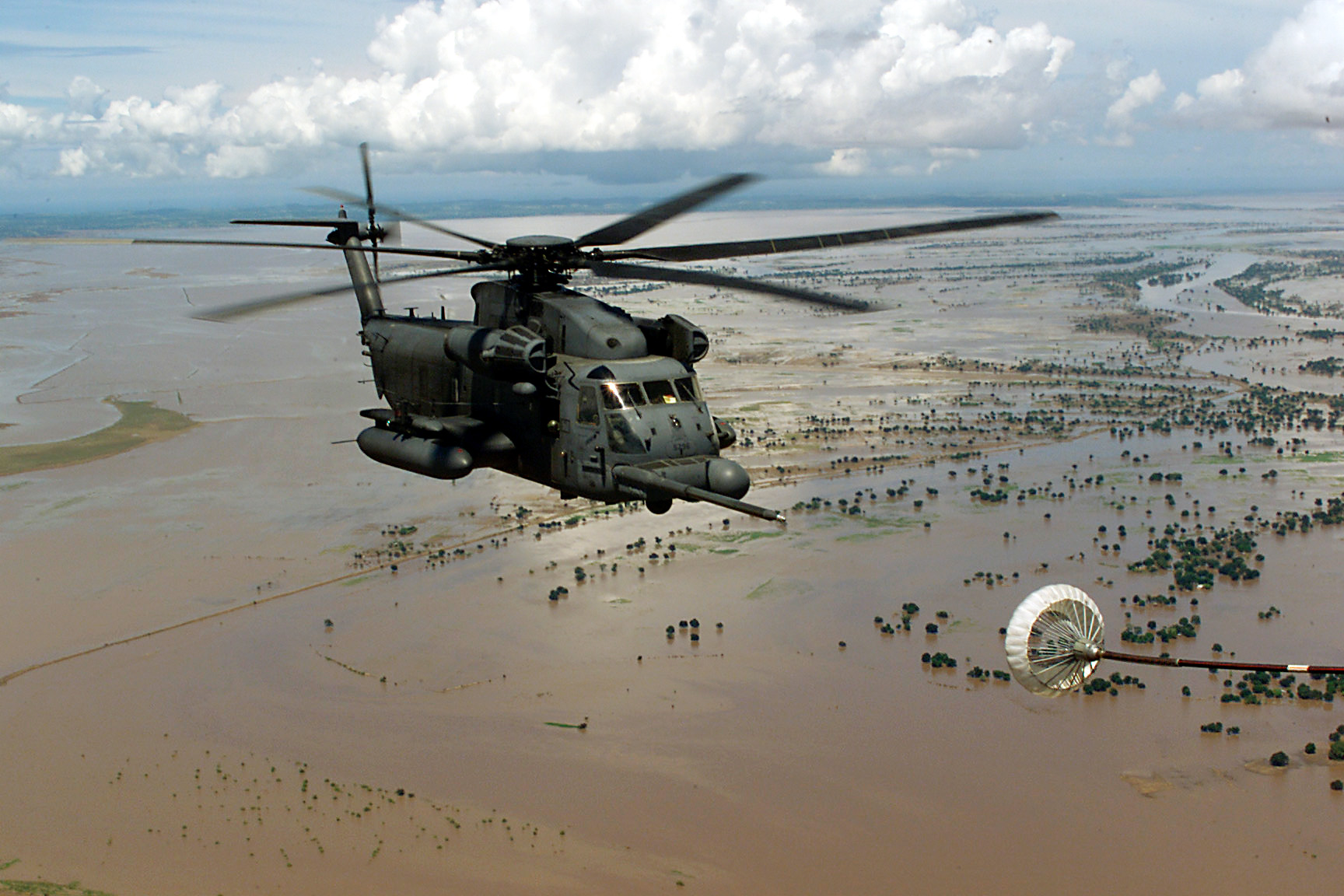
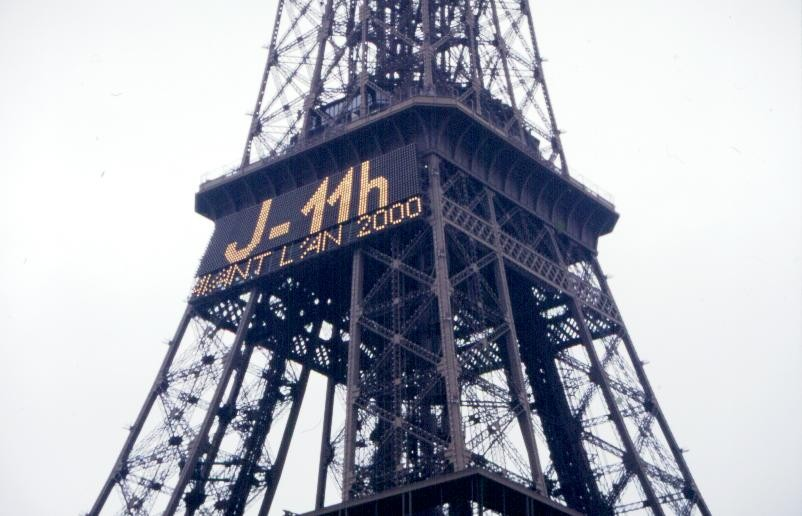
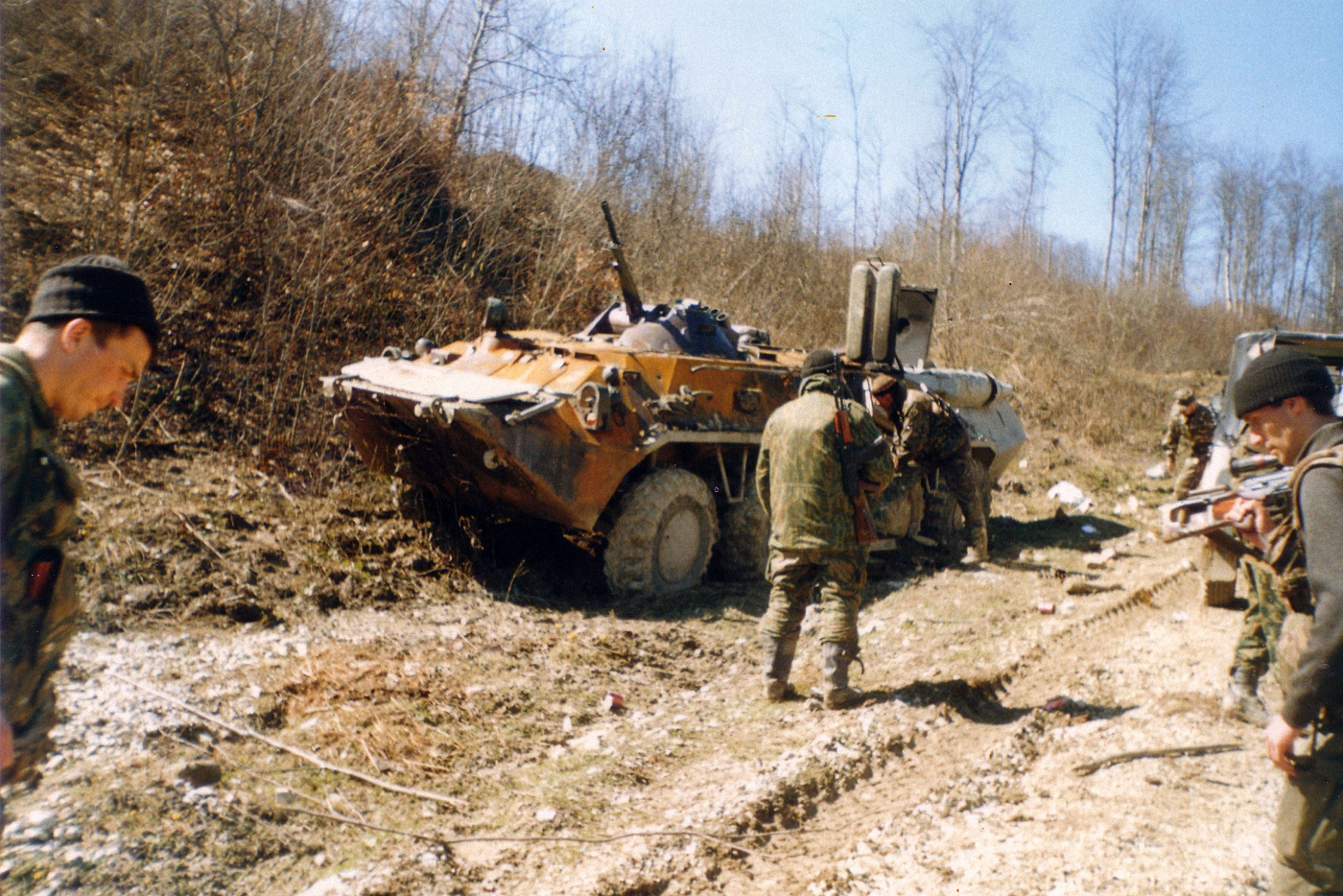
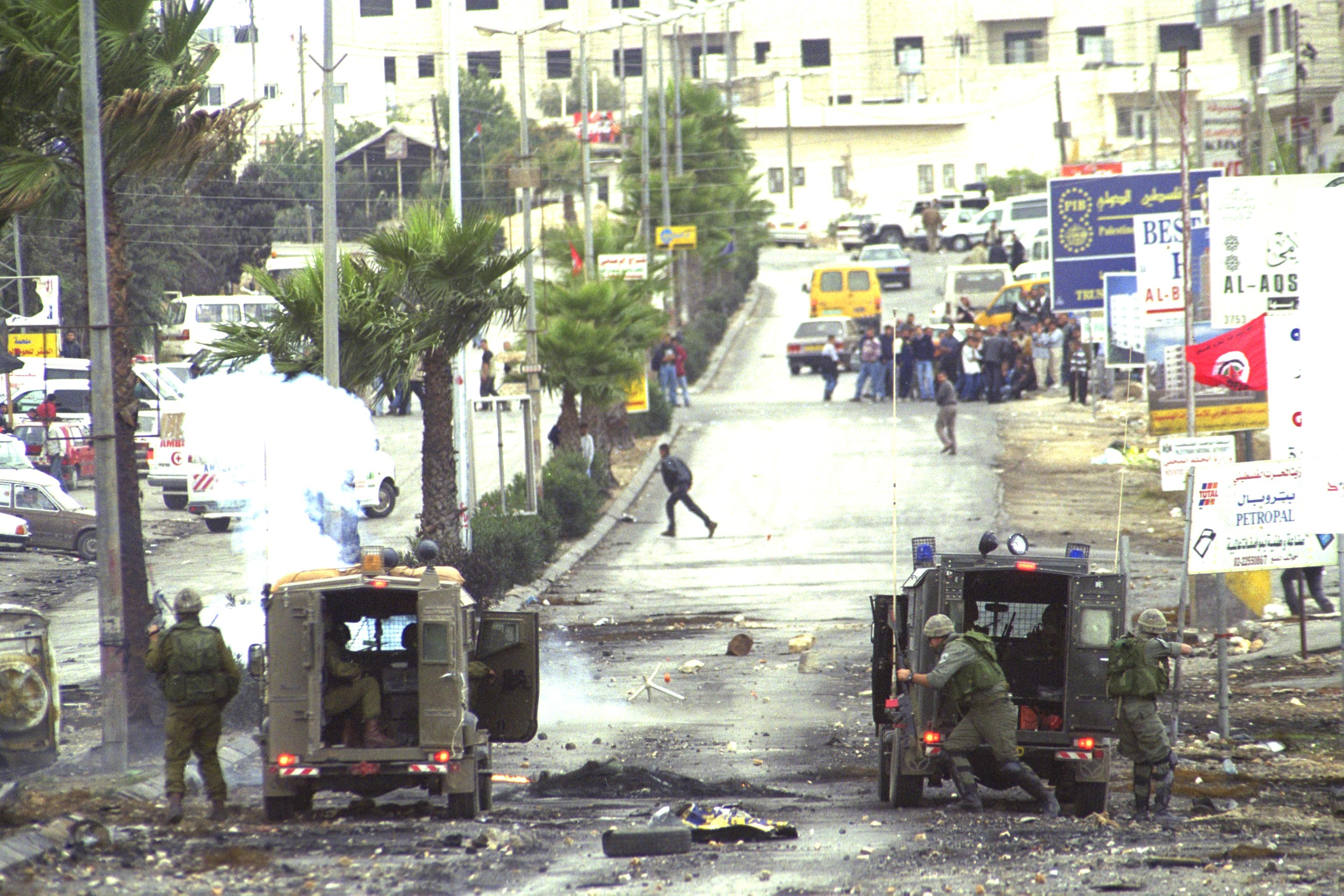
From left to right, top to bottom:
- A tunnel fire in Kaprun, Austria, kills 155;
- the Kursk submarine disaster, a Russian naval accident in the Barents Sea, where its Oscar II-class nuclear submarine, K-141, sank during exercises, killing all 118 crew members;
- the 2000 Summer Olympics are held in Sydney, Australia;
- Air France Flight 4590, a scheduled Concorde supersonic jet flight that crashed shortly after takeoff from Paris, France following a fire on the back of the aircraft, killing all 109 people aboard and four on the ground;
- the 2000 Mozambique flood, the worst in the country's recorded history, caused by prolonged heavy rainfall and the devastating impact of Cyclone Eline;
- the Nasdaq Composite reaches its peak during the Dot-com bubble before crashing shortly after;
- the millennium celebrations refer to the worldwide festivities at the end of 1999 and the start of 2000;
- the Second Chechen War. Russian counter-insurgency and military conflict with the invasion of Dagestan by Chechen fighters, leading to Russian military incursions into Chechnya after apartment bombings in Russian cities;
- the Second Intifada civilian uprising in Jerusalem and Palestine proper. Israeli security responded with extreme violence, killing over 100 Palestinian protesters within the first few weeks.

2000 (MM) was a century leap year starting on Saturday of the Gregorian calendar, the 2000th year of the Common Era (CE) and Anno Domini (AD) designations, the 1000th and last year of the 2nd millennium, the 100th and last year of the 20th century, and the 1st year of the 2000s decade.

2000 was designated as the International Year for the Culture of Peace and the World Mathematical Year.

Popular culture holds the year 2000 as the first year of the 21st century and the 3rd millennium, because of a tendency to group the years according to decimal values, as if non-existent year zero was counted. According to the Gregorian calendar, these distinctions fall to the year 2001, because the 1st century was retroactively said to start with the year AD 1. Since the Gregorian calendar does not have year zero, its first millennium spanned from years 1 to 1000 inclusively and its second millennium from years 1001 to 2000. (For further information, see century and millennium.)

The year 2000 is sometimes abbreviated as "Y2K" (the "Y" stands for "year", and the "K" stands for "kilo" which means "thousand"). The year 2000 was the subject of Y2K concerns, which were fears that computers would not shift from 1999 to 2000 correctly. However, by the end of 1999, many companies had already converted to new, or upgraded existing, software. Some even obtained "Y2K certification". As a result of massive effort, relatively few problems occurred.

The eighth year of the post–Cold War era, significant conflicts included the Second Chechen War in the Caucasus and the Second Intifada in Israel and Palestine. This was the first year of continuous physical human presence in space, as Expedition 1 began on the International Space Station.

== Events ==
=== January ===
- January 1
  - Millennium celebrations are held around the world to celebrate the beginning of the 3rd millennium.
  - The year 2000 problem, a time formatting and storage bug, takes effect, but is successfully mitigated in many cases.
- January 4 – The Philippines executes convicted rapist Alex Bartolome, who became the last prisoner to be executed in the country before its abolition in 2006.
- January 6 – The last naturally conceived Pyrenean ibex is found dead, presumed to have been killed by a falling tree.
- January 8 – In Soria (Spain) a large chunk of ice is reported to have fallen from the sky. Over the following months, a social panic about this phenomenon is unleashed, with reports of a multitude of similar cases of falling ice chunks (incorrectly named as aerolites) all over Spain, attracting great attention from the Spanish media.
- January 10 – America Online announces an agreement to purchase Time Warner for $162 billion (the largest-ever corporate merger).
- January 14
  - The Dow Jones Industrial Average closes at 11,722.98 (at the peak of the Dot-com bubble).
  - The United Nations' International Criminal Tribunal for the former Yugoslavia sentences five Bosnian Croats to up to 25 years in prison for the 1993 killing of more than 100 Bosnian Muslims.
- January 30 – Kenya Airways Flight 431 crashes off the Ivory Coast into the Atlantic Ocean, killing 169 people.
- January 31 – Alaska Airlines Flight 261 crashes off the California coast into the Pacific Ocean, killing all 88 passengers and crew.

=== February ===
- February 5
  - Second Chechen War: Novye Aldi massacre – Russian forces summarily execute 56–60 civilians in a suburb of Grozny.
  - 2000 Six Nations Championship in rugby union opens, the first year in which Italy takes part.
- February 6 – Second Chechen War: Battle of Grozny (1999–2000) ends as Russian forces conclude capture of the Chechen capital Grozny.
- February 9 – Torrential rains in Africa led to the worst flooding in Mozambique in 50 years, which lasts until March and kills 800 people.
- February 13 – Final Peanuts comic is printed in newspapers, preceded by author Charles M. Schulz's death the night before. It is the most popular comic strip in history, running for 50 years.
- February 17 – Microsoft releases Windows 2000.
- February 21 – UNESCO holds the inaugural celebration of International Mother Language Day.
- February 29 – A rare century leap year date occurs. Usually, century years are common years due to not being exactly divisible by 400. 2000 is the first such year to have a February 29 since the year 1600, making it only the second such occasion since the Gregorian Calendar was introduced in 1582. The next such leap year will occur in 2400.

=== March ===
- March 10 – The NASDAQ Composite Index reaches an all-time high of 5,048. Two weeks later, the NASDAQ-100, S&P 500, and Wilshire 5000 reach their peaks prior to the Dot-com bubble, ending a bull market run that had lasted over 17 years.
- March 12
  - Pope John Paul II apologizes for the wrongdoings by members of the Roman Catholic Church throughout the ages.
  - A Zenit-3SL sea launch fails due to a software bug.
- March 13 – The United States dollar becomes the official currency of Ecuador, replacing the Ecuadorian sucre.
- March 17 – Uganda mass suicide: 778 members of the Movement for the Restoration of the Ten Commandments of God die in Uganda.
- March 26 – 2000 Russian presidential election: Vladimir Putin is elected President of Russia.

=== April ===
- April 19 – Air Philippines Flight 541, a Boeing 737-200, crashes during approach at Davao City, Philippines, killing 131 people, making it the deadliest air disaster in the Philippines.
- April 30 – Canonization of Polish Catholic sister Faustina Kowalska in the presence of 200,000 people and the first Divine Mercy Sunday is celebrated worldwide.

=== May ===
- May 1 – A new class of composite material is fabricated, which has a combination of physical properties never before seen in a natural or human-made material.
- May 2 — The Selective Availability limiter is removed from the Global Positioning System, allowing for practical general-purpose use. The date is sometimes known as "Blue Switch Day".
- May 4 – The 7.6 M_{w} Central Sulawesi earthquake affects Banggai, Indonesia, with a maximum Mercalli intensity of VII (Very strong), leaving 46 dead and 264 injured.
- May 5
  - After originating in the Philippines, the ILOVEYOU computer virus spreads quickly throughout the world.
  - A rare conjunction of seven celestial bodies (Sun, Moon, planets Mercury–Saturn) occurs during the new moon.
- May 11 – India's population reaches 1 billion.
- May 13
  - A fireworks factory disaster in Enschede, Netherlands, kills 23.
  - Millennium Force opens at Cedar Point amusement park in Sandusky, Ohio, as the world's tallest and fastest roller coaster.
- May 24 – Real Madrid C.F. defeats Valencia CF 3–0 in the UEFA Champions League Final at Stade de France to win their second title between 1998 and 2002, and their eighth overall.

=== June ===
- June 4 – The 7.9 M_{w} Enggano earthquake shakes southwestern Sumatra, killing 103 people and injuring at least 2,174.
- June 10–July 2 – Belgium and the Netherlands jointly host the UEFA Euro 2000 football tournament, which is won by France.
- June 17 – A centennial earthquake (6.5 on the Richter scale) hits Iceland on its national day.
- June 21 – Another earthquake hits Iceland further west than the previous quake.
- June 26 – A first draft of the Human Genome Project is finished. It is announced at the White House by U.S. President Clinton with Francis Collins and J. Craig Venter jointly with the UK Prime Minister in London.

=== July ===
- July 1 – The Øresund Bridge between Denmark and Sweden is officially opened for traffic.
- July 2 – France defeats Italy 2–1 after extra time in the final of the UEFA Euro 2000 Championship in Association football, becoming the first team to win the World Cup and European Championship consecutively.
- July 2 – Vicente Fox of the National Action Party (PAN) is elected President of Mexico, becoming the first president not from the Institutional Revolutionary Party (PRI) since 1929.
- July 10 – In southern Nigeria, a leaking petroleum pipeline explodes, killing about 250 villagers who were scavenging gasoline.
- July 11–25 – A summit meeting takes place at Camp David between United States president Bill Clinton, Israeli prime minister Ehud Barak and Palestinian Authority chairman Yasser Arafat, ending without an agreement.
- July 14 – A powerful solar flare, later named the Bastille Day event, causes a geomagnetic storm on Earth.
- July 25 – Air France Flight 4590, a Concorde aircraft, crashes into a hotel in Gonesse just after takeoff from Paris, killing all 109 aboard and 4 in the hotel.

=== August ===
- August 8 – The US Confederate submarine H. L. Hunley is raised to the surface after 136 years on the ocean floor.
- August 12 – The Russian submarine Kursk sinks in the Barents Sea during one of the largest Russian naval exercises since the 1991 dissolution of the Soviet Union, resulting in the deaths of all 118 men on board.
- August 14 – Tsar Nicholas II and his family are canonized by the synod of the Russian Orthodox Church.
- August 23 – The state funeral of Abulfaz Elchibey, the second President of Azerbaijan, takes place in Baku.

=== September ===
- September 6 – The last wholly Swedish-owned arms manufacturer, Bofors, is sold to American arms manufacturer United Defense.
- September 6–8 – World leaders attend the Millennium Summit at U.N. Headquarters.
- September 7–14 – Fuel protests in the United Kingdom, with refineries blockaded and supply to the country's network of petrol stations halted.
- September 13 – Steve Jobs introduces the Mac OS X Public Beta for US$29.95.
- September 15–October 1 – The 2000 Summer Olympics, held in Sydney, Australia, is the first Olympic Games of the 2000s.
- September 16 – Ukrainian journalist Georgiy Gongadze is last seen alive; this day is taken as the commemoration date of his death.
- September 20 – The 2000 Xenia Tornado leaves 100 people injured, one person dead and 321+ houses destroyed.
- September 26 – The Greek ferry Express Samina sinks off the coast of the island of Paros; 80 out of a total of over 500 passengers perish in one of Greece's worst sea disasters.
- September 28 – Israeli opposition leader Ariel Sharon visits the Temple Mount in East Jerusalem, sparking an uprising that becomes the Second Intifada.

=== October ===
- October 5 – Mass demonstrations in Belgrade lead to resignation of Yugoslavia's president Slobodan Milošević.
- October 11 – 250 million US gallons (950,000 m^{3}) of coal sludge spill in Martin County, Kentucky, United States (considered a greater environmental disaster than the Exxon Valdez oil spill).
- October 12 – In Aden, Yemen, USS Cole is badly damaged by two Al-Qaeda suicide bombers, who place a small boat laden with explosives alongside the United States Navy destroyer, killing 17 crew members and wounding at least 39.
- October 17 – Hatfield rail crash: A Great North Eastern Railway Intercity 225 express train is derailed, killing four people and injuring many others, in Hatfield, Hertfordshire, England.
- October 22 – Japanese Prime Minister Yoshiro Mori and Singaporean Prime Minister Goh Chok Tong agree to begin formal negotiation for a Japan-Singapore Economic Agreement for a New Age Partnership (JSEPA).
- October 26 – Pakistani authorities announce that their police have found an apparent mummy of an alleged Persian Princess in the province of Balochistan, Pakistan. The governments of Iran, Pakistan as well as the Taliban of Afghanistan all claim the mummy until Pakistan announces it is a modern-day forgery in April 2001.
- October 31
  - Soyuz TM-31 is launched, carrying the first resident crew to the International Space Station. The ISS has been continuously crewed since.
  - Singapore Airlines Flight 006 collides with construction equipment in the Chiang Kai Shek International Airport, resulting in 83 deaths.

=== November ===
- November 2 – Expedition 1 to the International Space Station begins.
- November 7 – 2000 United States presidential election: No winner can be declared, prompting a controversial recount in Florida.
- November 11 – Kaprun disaster, Austria: A funicular fire in an Alpine tunnel kills 155 skiers and snowboarders.
- November 12 – The United States recognizes the Federal Republic of Yugoslavia.
- November 15 – Bihar is divided into two parts (by the Bihar Reorganisation Act, 2000) and Jharkhand, the 28th state of India, is created. Hence, this day is celebrated as Jharkhand Day.
- November 20 – Alberto Fujimori, President of Peru, faxes his resignation from a hotel room in Japan, having fled Peru after facing corruption charges. Fujimori would be officially removed from office by Congress on the 22nd.

=== December ===
- December 7 – Kadisoka temple is discovered in Sleman, Yogyakarta, Indonesia.
- December 12 – 2000 United States presidential election: The United States Supreme Court rules that the Florida recount between Texas governor George W. Bush and Vice President Al Gore should be halted and the original results be certified, thus making Bush the winner of the presidential election.
- December 15 – The third and final reactor at the Chernobyl Nuclear Power Plant is shut down and the station is shut down completely.
- December 23 – In the 2000 Serbian parliamentary election an alliance of reformist parties achieves a landslide victory over the nationalists, paving the way for a government under Zoran Đinđić.
- December 24 – The Christmas Eve bombings in several churches in Indonesia kill 18 people.
- December 25 – The Luoyang Christmas fire at a shopping center in China kills 309 people.

== World population ==
World population
	2000	1995			2005		
World	6,070,581,000	5,674,380,000	▲396,201,000	+6.98%	6,453,628,000	▲383,047,000	+6.31%
Africa	795,671,000	707,462,000	▲88,209,000	+12.47%	887,964,000	▲92,293,000	+11.60%
Asia	3,679,737,000	3,430,052,000	▲249,685,000	+7.28%	3,917,508,000	▲237,771,000	+6.46%
Europe	727,986,000	727,405,000	▲581,000	+0.08%	724,722,000	▼3,264,000	−0.45%
Latin America	520,229,000	481,099,000	▲39,130,000	+8.13%	558,281,000	▲38,052,000	+7.31%
Northern America	315,915,000	299,438,000	▲16,477,000	+5.50%	332,156,000	▲16,241,000	+5.14%
Oceania	31,043,000	28,924,000	▲2,119,000	+7.33%	32,998,000	▲1,955,000	+6.30%

== Nobel Prizes ==

- Chemistry – Alan J. Heeger, Alan MacDiarmid, and Hideki Shirakawa
- Economics – James Heckman and Daniel McFadden
- Literature – Gao Xingjian
- Peace – Kim Dae-jung
- Physics – Zhores Alferov, Herbert Kroemer, and Jack Kilby
- Physiology or Medicine – Arvid Carlsson, Paul Greengard, and Eric Kandel
