= Brigido =

Brigido is a given name and a surname. Notable people with the name include:

- Brígido Iriarte (1921–1984), Venezuelan Olympic track and field athlete
- Brígido Lara (born 1939/40), Mexican artist
- Bruno Brigido (born 1991), Brazilian footballer
- Rúben Brígido (born 1991), Portuguese footballer

== See also ==
- Brígido Iriarte Stadium, a multi-purpose stadium in Caracas, Venezuela
