= Mummy forgeries =

Fake archaeological finds

Throughout history there have been several mummy forgeries.

By the 18th century fake mummies were made in Europe for the production of Mummia. These were made by drying any available human corpses in ovens before grinding or cutting them up in preparation for sale.

== Hackensack forgery ==
In 1928, The Washington Post reported an event in Hackensack, New Jersey when an "Egyptian Princess" was found to be a forgery. A local minister who said he acquired it in Europe had given it to the Bergen Country Historical Society in 1902. It gained great notoriety on display in the Johnson Public Library until the curator, Mrs. Frances Westervelt, found it to be a rag-stuffed fake. The "mummy" was removed and incinerated.

== Mississippi State Capitol forgery ==
In the 1920s, the Mississippi Department of Archives and History purchased a large collection of Native American artifacts from the nephew of Colonel Brevoort Butler after Butler's death. Included in these artifacts was one item that was clearly not of Native origin, an Egyptian mummy. For decades this item was on display in the State Capitol Building, becoming a much-loved attraction and source of local pride.

In 1969, Gentry Yeatman, a medical student with an interest in archeology, asked the museum for human remains to study for evidence of disease. Permission was granted to remove the mummy and for it to be sent to the University of Mississippi Medical Center for an autopsy. Radiological examination showed a few animal ribs and several square nails holding together a wooden frame.

Upon closer examination it was found to be primarily composed of papier-mâché. German newsprint was found as well as an 1898 issue of the Milwaukee Journal. The fake mummy has now become more famous than ever and transformed into a prized possession linked deeply to the folk history of Mississippi.

== Persian Princess ==
The Persian Princess or Persian Mummy is a mummy of an alleged Persian princess that surfaced in Pakistani Baluchistan in October 2000. After huge publicity and further investigation, the mummy proved to be an archaeological forgery and possibly a murder victim.

== See also ==
- Archaeological forgery
- List of hoaxes
- Mummy
- Persian Princess
