= Asma Ibrahim =

Pakistani archaeologist and museologist

- Education: University of Karachi; University of Wisconsin-Madison; Agha Khan University and Hospital
- Occupations: Archaeologist and museologist
- Known for: Formed the Sindh Exploration and Adventure Society
- Awards: Tamgha-e-Imtiaz from the State of Pakistan (2023)

Asma Ibrahim is a Pakistani archaeologist, museologist, and conservationist who is the founding director of the Museum, Archives and Art Gallery Department for the State Bank of Pakistan. Ibrahim has previously served as the curator and director of the National Museum of Pakistan.

== Early life and education ==
Asma’s father died when she was 13. After his death, she struggled to complete her studies, having to do part-time jobs from a very early age and relying on scholarships.

Asma graduated in microbiology, zoology, and chemistry from the University of Karachi. She was interested in archaeology but there was no archaeology department at the University of Karachi so she opted for a master's degree in history. This allowed her to take archaeology as an option in her second year. She graduated with a gold medal.

She attended a course at the Lahore Museum by Ahmed Hasan Dani, an authority on Central Asian and South Asian Archaeology and History. On Dani’s advice, she pursued a PhD in General History (Numismatics). Ibrahim's concentration was on Numismatics, specifically on Indo-Greek Kingdom coinage in Sindh and Balochistan.

Asma was the recipient of a Fulbright scholarship for a post-doctorate degree in 'Ancient Human Remains' at the University of Wisconsin-Madison.

She took a two-year course in Anatomy from the Agha Khan University and Hospital.

== Career ==
After completing her master's degree in history from The University of Karachi, Asma sought a job at the Department of Archaeology and Museums within the Pakistani government but there was no space for a woman in that department.

She became an editor for Far Eastern Publication in 1986 and authored two course books on Social Sciences and Ancient History for pupils of grade 4 and 5. She served as an editor for Travelog International and a sub-editor for Tribune Daily. She was also a freelance writer for Dawn.

Eventually, the Federal Public Service Commission announced an open position for curator or assistant director at the Department of Archaeology and Museums. Asma was selected for the position because of her qualifications and sent to work in the Explorations and Excavation branch. She would be periodically transferred to work in the National Museum as well.

She went on her first excavations with a French team that was headed by a female archaeologist.

=== Fake mummy case ===
In 2000, when she was working as a curator in the National Museum, the Sindh Police contacted her about a smuggler who had acquired 3 mummies from Iran, and was planning to sell them at a profit. The police had recovered one of the mummies and asked her to examine it. Asma noticed it had started growing fungus; this was an indication that it was a fresh body that had not been preserved properly.

The mummy was claimed to be of an ancient Persian princess, over 2,600 years old, that had been encased in a carved stone coffin and placed inside a wooden sarcophagus. The mummy was taken to the museum. An Iranian delegation tried take it away as they assumed it was real. However, Asma had seen the CT scan which showed that typical methods of mummification had not been used, leading her to conclude that the mummy was fake.

For a year, she worked with an English Forensic pathologist to prove that the mummy was fake. They used relative dating and scientific analysis to conclude that the ‘mummy’ belonged to a female who had been murdered in 1996.

Asma is the President of the Karachi Conference Foundation.

In 1989, she formed a non-governmental organization (NGO) with Kaleemullah Lashari called The Sindh Exploration and Adventure Society, which does conservation work and documentation of heritage.

==== The Centre for Archaeological and Environmental Research ====
She established the Centre for Archaeological and Environmental Research, an NGO. The centre includes a conservation laboratory, a library, and a documentation cell, where archivists document heritage through photography, videos and drawings. It also trains people in Pakistani arts and crafts that are on the verge of dying out.

=== State Bank of Pakistan Museum ===
She joined the State Bank of Pakistan in 2006 and was tasked with setting up its museum. Under Asma’s leadership, the original plan of the museum was expanded to include an art gallery that features works by world-renowned artists from Pakistan. She established a division of Archive & record management along with a paper conservation lab at Under the department of Museum. Currently, she is the director of the Museum, Archives and Art Gallery Department at State Bank.

She has served as a consultant for the Oxford University Press Karachi Museum, Thatta Museum, Sindh Police Museum and the Mukhi House museum.

== Publications ==
- State Bank of Pakistan museum guide book, 2011
- Coins of Nadir Shah & Afghan rulers in State Bank Museum, 2015

2020

- A Catalogue of British Indian coins, in the State Bank of Pakistan Museum, Archives & Art Gallery
- Conservation of rare carpets in the State Bank of Pakistan

2019

- 1. Readapting of Heritage Building as first Monetary Museum, Imperial Bank of India a chapter to the third volume of Beyond Stones and More Stones, Edited by Prof. Dr. Ravi Korisettar
- 2. The role of museums, design accessibility and community concerns: A case study of State Bank of Pakistan Museum & Art Gallery Journal of Community Archaeology and Heritage Special Issue on Pakistan Uzma Z. Rizvi | Associate Professor of Anthropology & Urban Studies, PRATT INSTITUTE, Dept of Social Science and Cultural Studies, Dekalb 320, 200 Willoughby Ave | Brooklyn, NY 11205
- 3. People with special needs and role of museums, A case study of State Bank of Pakistan Museum & Art Gallery, ICOM book about Museum Management Edited by Catherine C.Cole co-editor Darko Babic

2018

- 1. The ancient human remains from Sarai Khola" the Felicitation Volume for the 65th birthday of Jonathan Mark Kenoyer, titled "Walking with the Unicorn. Social Organization and Material Culture in Ancient South Asia", both in printed and e-versions on the website of Archaeopress Publishing: https://www.archaeopress.com/ArchaeopressShop/Public/displayProductDetail.asp?id={946FE518-961D-49DE-A0C2-3579409D43A1}
- 2. Bactrian Indus-Greek Coin Catalogue in State Bank Museum
- 3. Conservation of Painting "Freedom Fighter"

2016

- 1- Treasuries of Time "Coloring Book" Sadequain in State Bank of Pakistan
- 2- Access in Museums in South Asia, Leaning from the Commonwealth Association of Museums' Regional workshop 2016, in partnership with the Maharaja Sawai Man Singh II Museum Trust, by ICOM, ICTOP, ICOM

2015

- Catalogue of Durrani Coins in the State Bank & Lahore Museum, published by State Bank Museum & Art Gallery Department, by State bank of Pakistan

2013

- Catalogue of Mughal coins in the Collection of State Bank Museum, published by State Bank of Pakistan

2011

- 1- A guide to the Museum, detailed guide book along with the conservation, and process of readapt ion of the building as Museum, the back ground and the whole process of Museum making from designing, furniture, display and other technical aspects of museum establishment.
- 2- "Re-adaption of historic building as a Museum, special reference to conservation of colonial building" talk delivered at international conference on Archaeology, Islamabad, organized by AIPS, and Dept. of Archaeology & Museums, Govt. of Pakistan.

2007

- Stable Isotope Analysis of Human Remains as a Means for Pursuing the Study of Ancient Population Mobility in Balochistan (A. Ibrahim), SOHR DAMB/NAL - Rekonstruktion einer prähistorischen Kultur, Bericht2005-2008.

2002

- Restoration of Rumi: 17th century Burial Ground with Carved Gravestones, Published in the Journal, National Institute of Public Administration, Gulshan-e-Iqbal, University Road Karachi, June 2002.

2001

- 1- "The Mystery of the Mummy", Dr. Asma Ibrahim, 'The Archaeological Review' (Vol 8-9, 2000), a detailed report is given how the Mummy proved to be fake.
- 2- A new perspective of an old Site: Reopening excavation at SohrDamb/Nal (Baluchistan), Ute Franke-Vogt & Asma Ibrahim, to appear in South Asian Archaeology 2001.

2000

- 1- A Catalogue of Lacquer and papiermache work on wooden objects from Victoria Museum,' The Archaeological Review' Vol. 8 and 9, 2000, published by Seas Pakistan, Karachi.
- 2- The Murals of Dadu, Dr. Asma Ibrahim & Dr. Kaleem Lashari, 'The Archaeological Review', Vol. 8 and 9, 2000, published by Seas, Pakistan

1999 Tharoo Hills, the fortress of Alexander the Great, Dr. Asma Ibrahim, 'The Archaeological Review', (Vol 8-9, 2000), A fortress belonging to Alexander the Great, discovered for the first time. 1998

- 1- A Catalogue of Indian Miniature Paintings in the National Museum of Pakistan, Karachi (in Process).
- 2- A unique & rare Manuscript of Poetic(Persia) translation of the Holy Quran, Asma Ibrahim & Dr. Khizr Naushahi, C'The Archaeological Review', Vol.6 & 7,1997–98, published by seas Pakistan
- 3- Niai Buthi Revisited; Asma Ibrahim, Ute Franke Vogt, Kaleem Lashari; 'The Archaeological Review' (Vol. V, pp. 1–44); a survey of an archaeological site in Kanrach valley, Baluchistan, Pakistan.
- 4- Feminine Element in Kohistani Graves of Sindh & Baluchistan; published in 'The Archaeological Review' (Vol. V).
- 5- The Commemorative Funerary Structure in Sindh and Baluchistan, in the 'Journal of Women Study Center'.
- 6- A Study of Regional Languages of Pakistan – A Link between Sindhi and Punjabi Languages (The study is ongoing).

1994

- 1- Monograms of Indo-Greek Coins; published in the 'Journal of Pakistan Historical Society' (Vol. X1, Part IV, and pp. 389–410).
- 2- Monograms of Indo-Greek Coins; published in the 'Journal of Pakistan Historical Society' (Vol. X1, Part IV, and pp. 389–410).

1993

- 1- A Catalogue of Indo-Greek Coins Collection in the Taxila Museum, Pakistan (Due for publication).
- 2- Recent Archaeological Discoveries in the Indus Delta; published in the 'Journal of Pakistan Archaeologists' Forum' (Vol. II, Issues I & II, pp. 1–44).
- 3- Recent Archaeological Discoveries in the Indus Delta; published in the 'Journal of Pakistan Archaeologists' Forum' (Vol. II, Issues I & II, pp. 1–44).
- 4- Deities on Indo-Greek Coins (Submitted for publication to the Department of Archaeology and Museums.

1992

- 1- Portraits of Indo-Greek Queens; published in the 'Journal of Pakistan Archaeologists' Forum' (Vol. 1, Issues I & II, pp. 52–63).
- 2- Art in Indo-Greek Coins; published in the 'Journal of Pakistan Archaeologists' Forum' (Vol. 1, Issues I & II, pp. 67–78).

1990

- 1- Mysterious Signs of Indus Valley Civilization; published in 'The Archaeology' (Vol. III, No. 1, pp. 54–57).
- 2- Greek Rulers in Sindh; presentation in a seminar on 'History Through Coins', held at Liaquat Memorial Library, Karachi under auspices of Department of Culture, Government of Sindh, Pakistan; due for publication in the 'Journal of Indian Society for Greek and Roman Studies' and 'Yavanika', Barailley, India.

1988

- A Catalogue of Persian Pottery in the National Museum of Pakistan, Karachi (Submitted for publication).

1987

- Social Studies Book-5, Far Eastern Publications International, Karachi, Pakistan.

1987

- Ancient Times, Book-4, Far Eastern Publications International, Karachi, Pakistan (Due for publication).
