= Gosford Glyphs =

Hoax hieroglyphs in Kariong, Australia

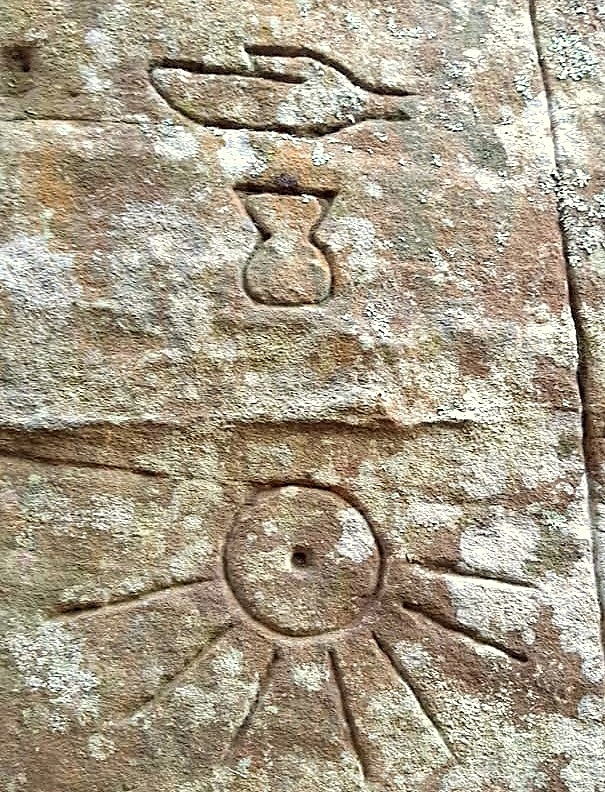
- Egyptian-style petroglyphs
- Interactive map of Gosford Glyphs
- 33°27′07″S 151°18′11″E
- Location: Kariong, Central Coast

The Gosford Glyphs, also known as Kariong Hieroglyphs, are a group of approximately 300 Egyptian-style hieroglyphs located in Kariong, Australia. They are found in an area known for its Aboriginal petroglyphs, between Gosford and Woy Woy, New South Wales, within the Brisbane Water National Park.

The glyphs have been dismissed as a hoax by authorities and academics after their discovery in the 1970s, but there are still attempts to prove the false belief that they were carved by the ancient Egyptians about 4,500 years ago.

While rumours of Egyptian glyphs have existed since the 1920s, a spokesperson for the National Parks and Wildlife Service (NPWS) has said "The engravings are something we became aware of in the early 1980s, which is around the time the majority were thought to have been made."

In late 2023 the NPWS began dislodging boulders it deemed unsafe near the glyphs. These works were criticised by residents and a local environmental protection organisation as unnecessary and extreme.

== Description ==
They depict boats, chickens, dogs, owls, stick men, a dog's bone as well as two cartouches that appear to be the names of kings, one of them Khufu (second king of the Fourth Dynasty, 2637–2614 BC), the other uncertain. These names are given the same personal name and throne name. There is also a carving of the ancient Egyptian god Anubis.

== Discovery ==
The carvings were first formally reported in 1975 by Alan Dash, a local surveyor working for Gosford Council who had been visiting the area for seven years without seeing the glyphs. Dash continued to visit for five years and saw new glyphs whenever he visited. Up until their discovery, the site of the glyphs was engulfed with sand and rocks, and had overgrown vegetation. In 1983, David Lambert, then a rock art conservator for the NPWS, found some clean-cut hieroglyphs which he estimated to be less than twelve months old. From the mid 1990s, the site started to receive more public attention.

Since then, the hieroglyphs have been claimed by pseudohistorians to be authentic script created about 4,500 years ago, by Egyptians who sailed to Australia and engraved their story into the stones after becoming shipwrecked.

== Authenticity ==
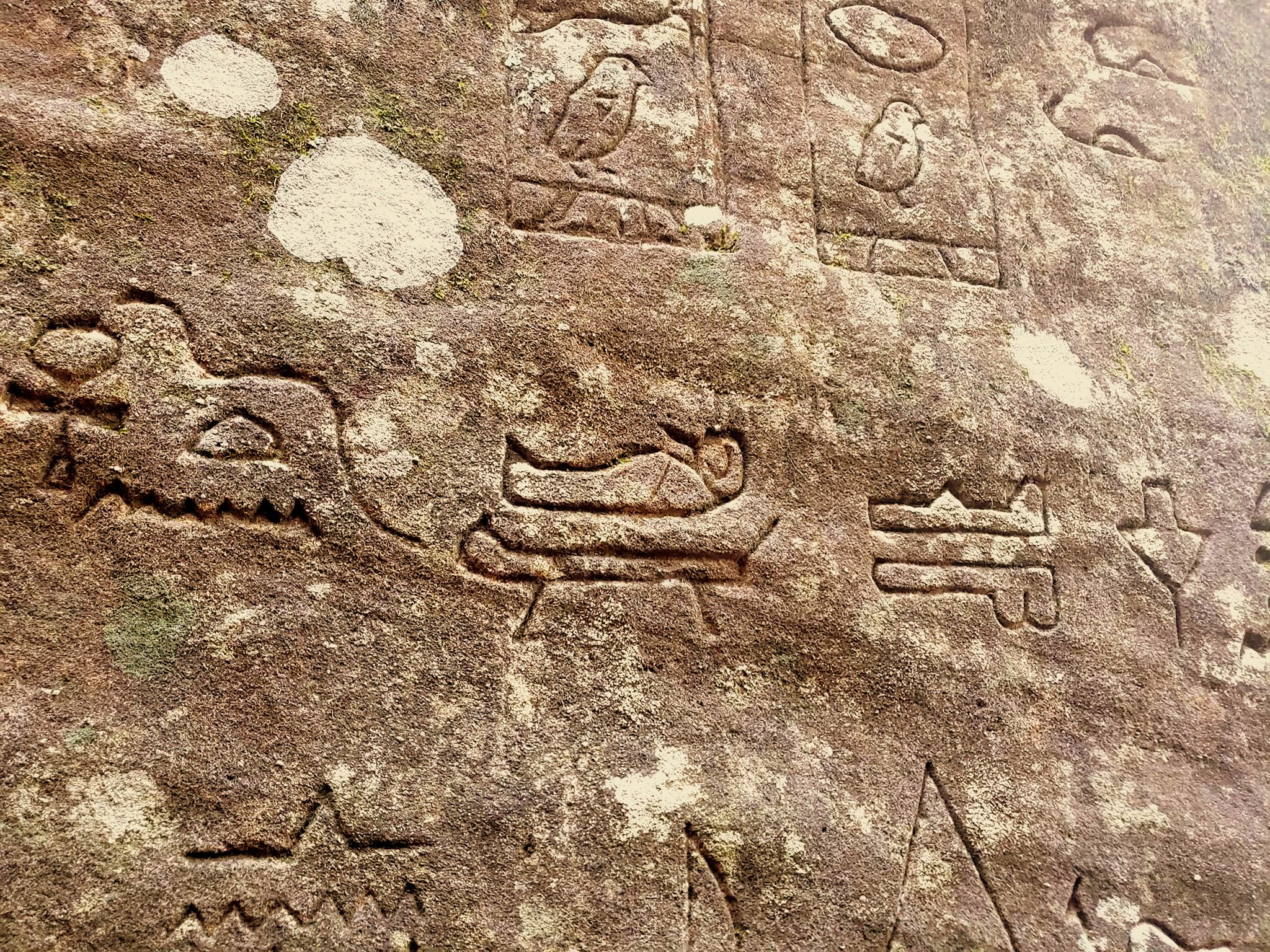
Site displaying Wadjet, Horus, water, ankh and sarcophagus symbols

Professor Boyo Ockinga has said:

[T]here are many reasons why they are not accepted as genuine hieroglyphics...

First of all the way they're cut is not the way ancient Egyptian rock inscriptions are produced, they're very disorganised...

There's also a problem with the actual shapes of the signs that are used. There's no way people would've been inscribing texts from the time of Cheops from the signs that weren't invented until 2500 years later.

He suggested that the glyphs might have been made in the 1920s by Australian soldiers when there was general interest in ancient Egypt after the uncovering of the Tomb of Tutankhamun at that time. The soldiers, who had served in the Sultanate of Egypt from the mid 1910s to early 1920s, cited an example of shapes in the form of the Sphinx and a pyramid known to have been made by a returning soldier.

Australian Professor of Egyptology Naguib Kanawati has also stated that they are not authentic and that they "were constructed in the early 1980s", concluding that the hieroglyphs within the same panels were of widely different periods and some were carved backwards. Other theories for their creation include high school students who copied them from their textbooks in the 1970s and a Yugoslavian immigrant with an interest in Egyptology who etched them in the early 1980s. Geologists have stated that the sandstone in which the hieroglyphs are carved erodes quickly and nearby 250-year-old Aboriginal petroglyphs at the Bulgandry Aboriginal Art Site show considerably more erosion.

== Gallery ==
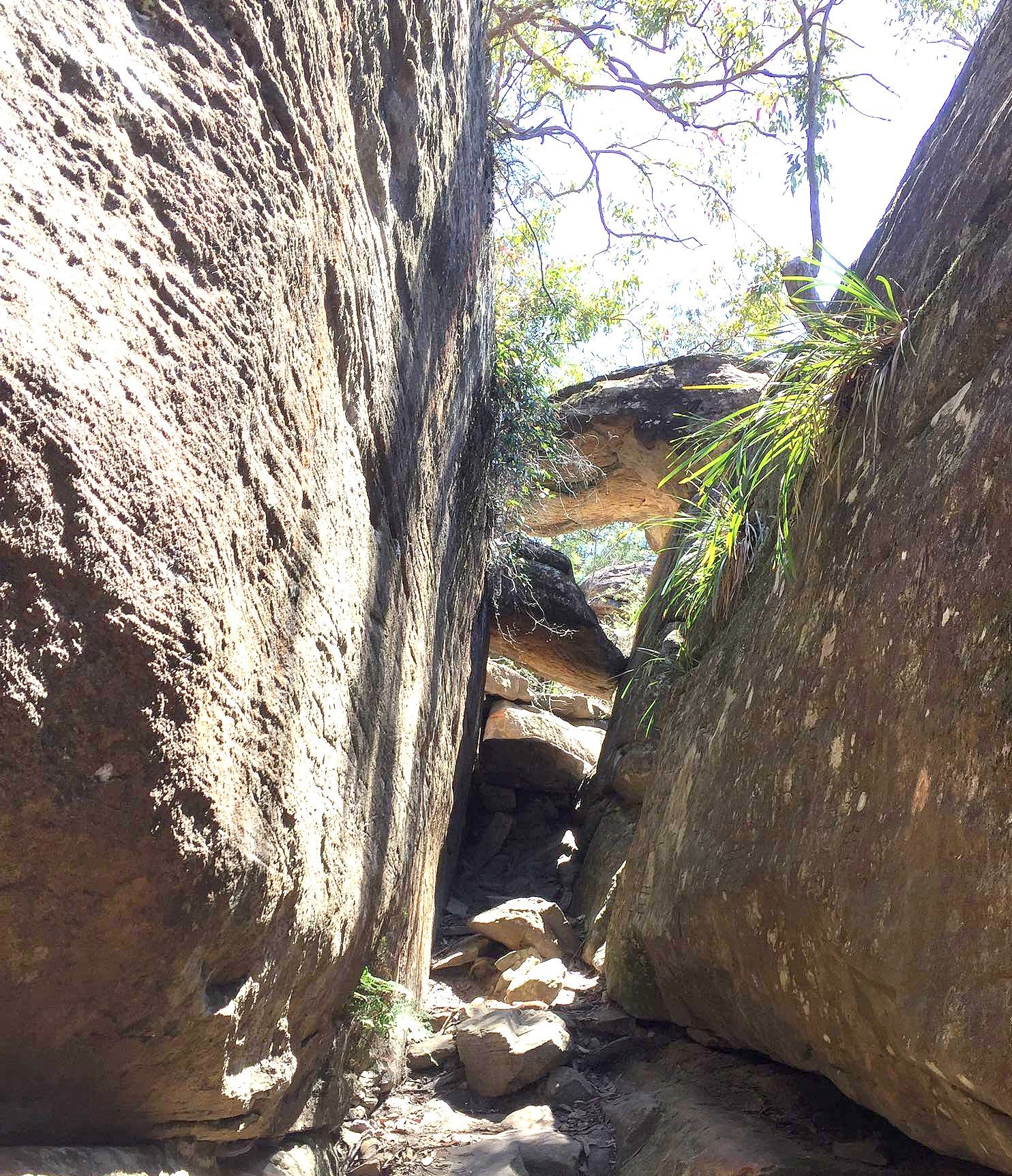
The parallel walls upon which the glyphs are carved

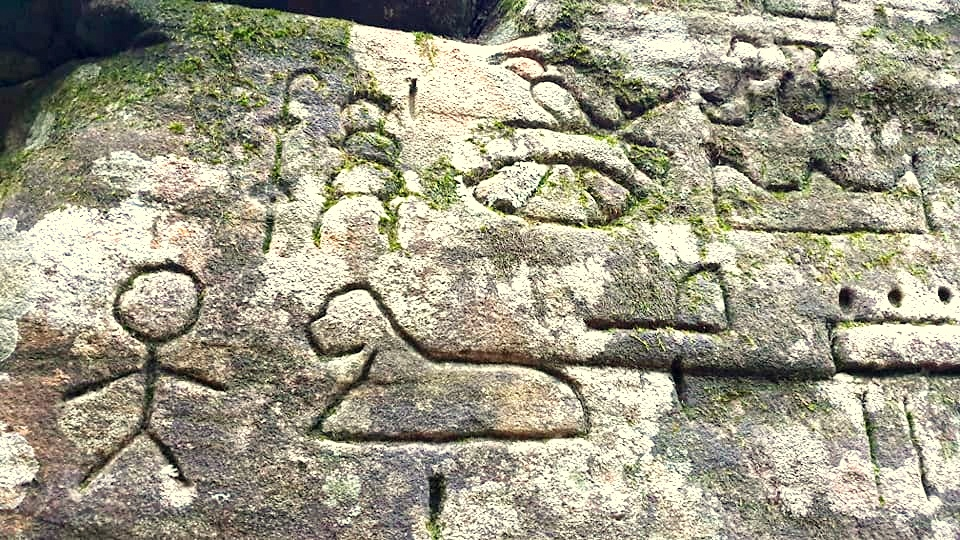
Miscellaneous symbols, including a sphinx and the Eye of Horus

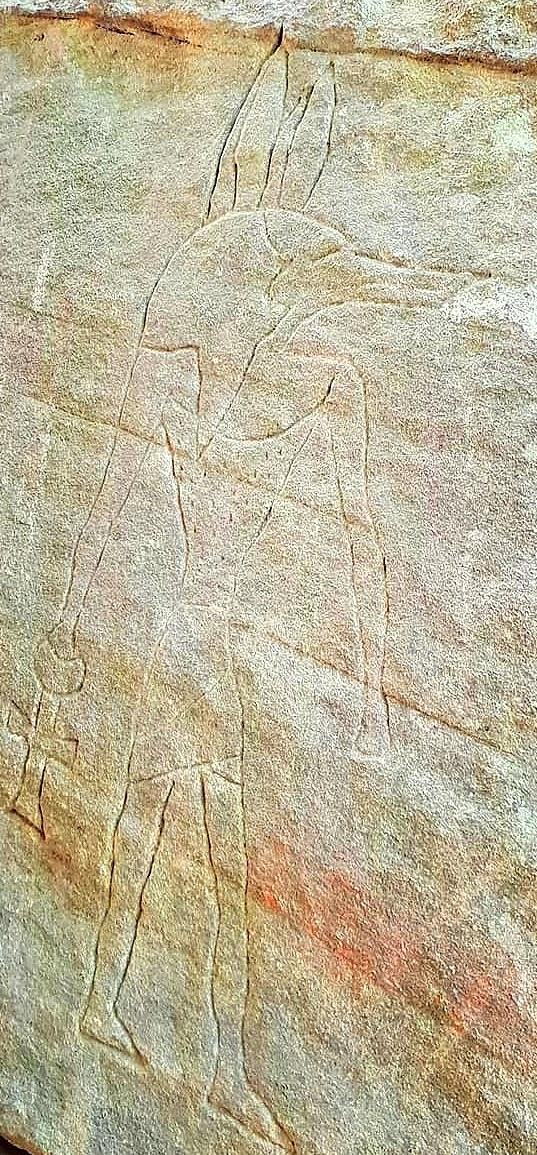
Egyptian God Anubis, the largest carving on the site
