= Vérité kiʻi =

Disputed Hawaiian carving in the Bishop Museum

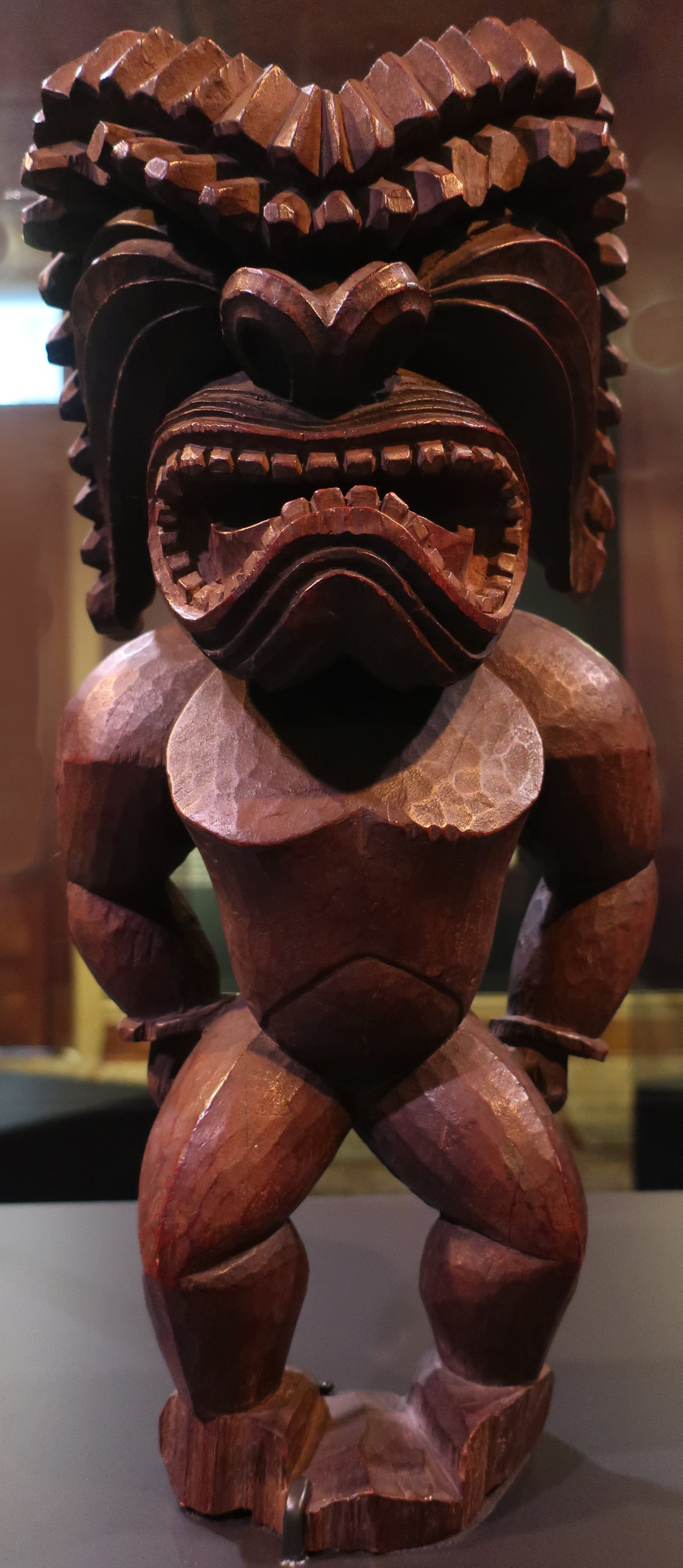
- The figure at the Bishop Museum
- Type: Kiʻi (Hawaiian religious image)
- Material: Wood, catalogued as Metrosideros
- Height: 53 cm (21 in)
- Created: Disputed; catalogued by Christie's as c. 1780–1820
- Present location: Bishop Museum, Honolulu
- Classification: Kona style

The Vérité kiʻi is a 53 cm (21 in) wooden Hawaiian religious image in the collection of the Bishop Museum in Honolulu. Christie's Paris cataloged it as a representation of Kū-kaʻili-moku and auctioned it on November 21, 2017, from the collection of the dealers Pierre and Claude Vérité. It sold for €6,345,000 (equivalent to €7.678 million in 2023), then a record price for an Oceanic artifact.

Although Christie's had dated the carving to about 1780–1820, several specialists in Oceanic art have argued that it is a later imitation, and its age remains unresolved.

== Description ==
The kiʻi is in a warrior's pose with bent knees, flexed calves, and fists clenched behind it. It has an open, toothed mouth and wears the type of headdress associated with Kū. Its surface has been faceted by a small adz. These characteristics are in line with the "Kona style" of Hawaiian figure sculpture, described by Peter Buck and by J. Halley Cox and William H. Davenport.

The Bishop Museum describes the wood as ʻōhiʻa, or the genus Metrosideros. (Note: Christie's described the wood as ʻōhiʻa lehua, which they identified as the species Metrosideros collina; botanists Paula J. Rudall and Caroline R. Cartwright identified ʻōhiʻa lehua as a different species, Metrosideros polymorpha, which "is closely related to M. collina".)

== Provenance ==
Pierre Vérité (1900–1993), a Paris dealer whose clients included Matisse and Picasso, reportedly acquired the kiʻi in the 1940s from Marie-Ange Ciolkowska, who ran a gallery on the Quai Voltaire; Christie's attributed this account to family tradition. The figure's history before this, and how it came to Paris, are undocumented. It was not known publicly before the 2017 sale, and Christie's represented it as "une authentique découverte" ('a genuine discovery').

The kiʻi was lot 153 in Christie's Paris sale of the Vérité collection on November 21, 2017, with an estimate of €2–3 million. Susan Kloman, Christie's head of African and Oceanic art, said the figure's mate was in the British Museum, and described the house's authentication as Morellian analysis of the carving's details. Christie's identified the wood and radiocarbon-dated it before the auction. (Note: Radiocarbon dating can estimate the age of a carving's wood, but cannot establish the date of the carving itself.) The data produced four possible ranges, with 1717–1780 and 1798–1891 as the most likely; the full possible date range was 1669 to 1944. The catalog compared it to three medium-sized figures: the London Missionary Society kiʻi at the British Museum and two akua kāʻai at the Bishop Museum.

It sold for €6,345,000, including the buyer's premium. The winning bid was placed anonymously online. The price was a record for an Oceanic work at auction, which stood until June 2021.

Months later, the Bishop Museum announced that the kiʻi had been donated to its collection and that the donors were billionaire CEO Marc Benioff of Salesforce and his wife Lynne. Danny Akaka Jr., a Hawaiian cultural practitioner, Bishop Museum board member, and Benioff's personal kahu, said the gift was the return of a cultural treasure to Hawaiʻi.

The kiʻi went on view in February 2019 as the centerpiece of the Bishop Museum's exhibition Kini Ke Kua: Transformative Images.

== Authenticity dispute ==
Doubts about the authenticity of the kiʻi were made public shortly after the sale. Mark Blackburn, a Honolulu collector of Polynesian artifacts who had examined the figure in Paris before the sale, believed it was not authentic, citing its stance, wood, absence of carved sex organs, lack of authentication by leading specialists, and its size: temple images of Kū were 9 to 12 ft (2.7 to 3.7 m) tall. He compared the figure to copies carved and sold under King Kalākaua in the late 19th century. Adrienne L. Kaeppler, then the curator of Oceanic ethnology at the Smithsonian Institution, said she was unaware that the figure had been authenticated. Christie's defended its cataloging as "extensively researched". The Bishop Museum announced plans for additional tests to establish the age more precisely, and, in late 2018, sent curators to London and Paris to investigate the figure's history.

The New York Times covered the dispute in 2019. London dealer Julian Harding, who said he had told Christie's before the sale that the figure was the mate of a British Museum sculpture, defended it as a masterpiece and thought it very likely came from the collection of missionary George Bennet, which Christie's marketing materials had included. Dissenters included Munich-based Pacific art expert Daniel Blau, who called the figure "the sort of thing you see in a tiki bar", and Paris dealer Anthony Meyer, who believed it was carved after the era of early European contact. Kaeppler said Christie's had consulted her before the sale, that the figure appeared to her to be a smaller replica of the British Museum sculpture, and that she was concerned its history could not be traced earlier than the 1930s.

Christie's responded by citing the research and stylistic analysis compiled before the sale, calling the figure "an important rediscovery that is sure to inspire continued scholarship and interest", and said that Kaeppler had seen the sculpture only in photographs. The date of its creation could not be confirmed.

Gilles Bounoure, a specialist in Oceanic art, linked the question of authenticity to an earlier group of forgeries. Small Hawaiian carvings made in Britain in the early 20th century, based on photographs of the British Museum's Kona-style images published in 1898 and 1913, were identified as fakes in 1981. A 1981 study by Adriaan Claerhout examined two nearly identical Kona-style figures a little over 50 cm (20 in) tall: one acquired by the Etnografisch Museum in Antwerp in 1972 before being found inauthentic, and another brought to Claerhout's attention in 1978. Both were carved from woods not native to Hawaiʻi, one from West African Aucoumea and the other from Cedrela. Neither had a collection history, which is unusual for Hawaiian images. The second figure had been offered to the Bishop Museum for purchase in 1979, but it did not buy it.
