= Sarai Khola =

Archaeological site near Taxila, Pakistan

- Type: Settlement
- Periods: Indus Valley Civilisation
- Location: near Taxila, Pakistan

Site notes
- Excavation dates: 1968-1973

Sarai Khola is an archaeological site located near Taxila, Punjab, Pakistan where the Indus Valley Civilization remains have been found. Sarai Khola in the Taxila valley excavated by F. A. Khan and M. A. Halim during 1968–1971.

== History ==
The site was discovered in 1968.

From 1968 to 1973, the department of archaeology conducted excavations in which several terra clay figurines of mother goddesses were discovered. In addition to chest blades and beads, terracotta vessels and trash were also discovered. The most intriguing discovery was the variety of ancient burial practices.
