= Kadisoka =

Hindu temple in Indonesia

Coordinates: 07°45′19.6″S 110°26′45.6″E

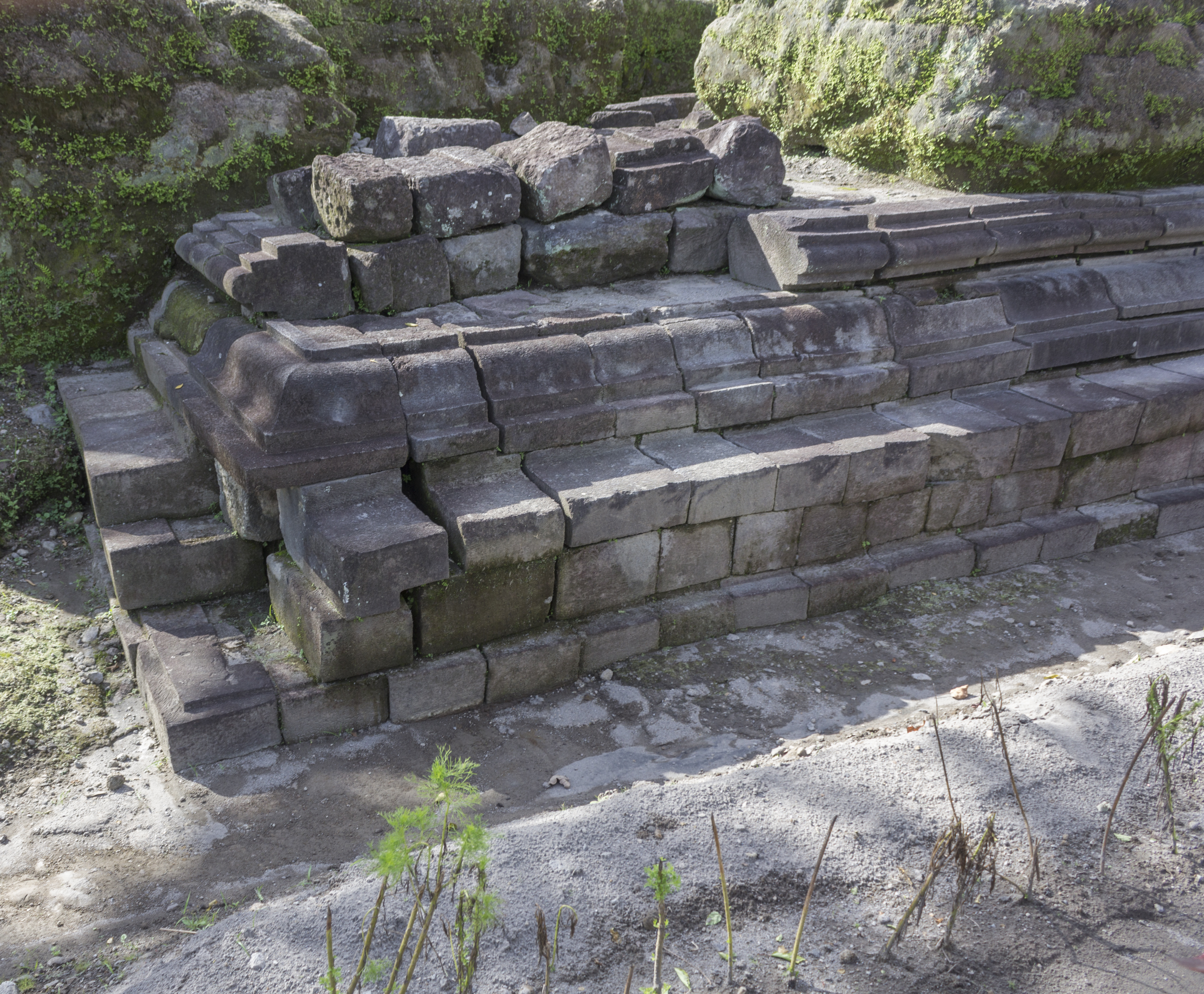
The exposed east side of the temple

Kadisoka (Indonesian: Candi Kadisoka) is a partially excavated temple, thought to be Hindu, in Sleman Regency, Special Region of Yogyakarta, Indonesia. It is listed as a Cultural Property of Indonesia.

== Layout ==
Kadisoka, which measures 6.49 metres (21.3 ft) by 6.9 metres (23 ft), is located on a 200 square metres (2,200 sq ft) patch of land. The land is planted with several species, including Hibiscus tiliaceus and Codiaeum variegatum. The temple is located in Kadisoka hamlet, Kalasan, Sleman, Yogyakarta, Indonesia, part of the fertile Kewu Plain. It is surrounded by agricultural fields, with the Kuning River running 100 metres (330 ft) to the east. The temple is some 8 kilometres (5.0 mi) north of Sambisari and located at an altitude of 150 metres (490 ft).

The temple is made of andesite; its stones are in fairly good condition, with little microbial growth. Its architectural style is thought to have been quite similar to that of the numerous other temples found in the Kewu Plain, based on the shape of the bell and half-circle shape of the base. It is oriented to the west, though off by about 10 degrees.

Kadisoka is maintained by two people, tasked with cleaning the site, reporting damage, and receiving visitors (be they tourists or pilgrims). Access to the site is limited by its dirt path, which becomes muddy during the rainy season.

== History ==
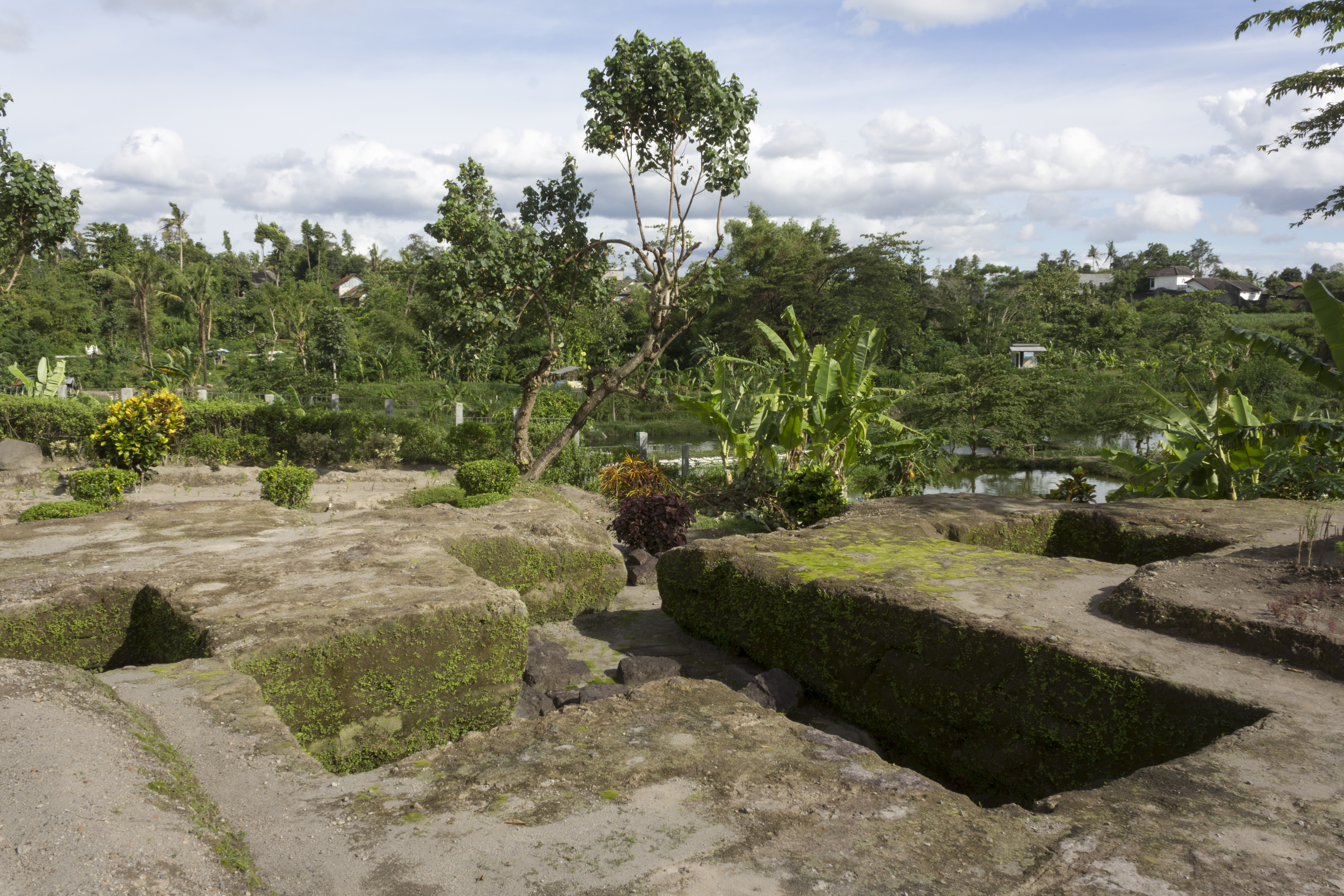
The excavation area

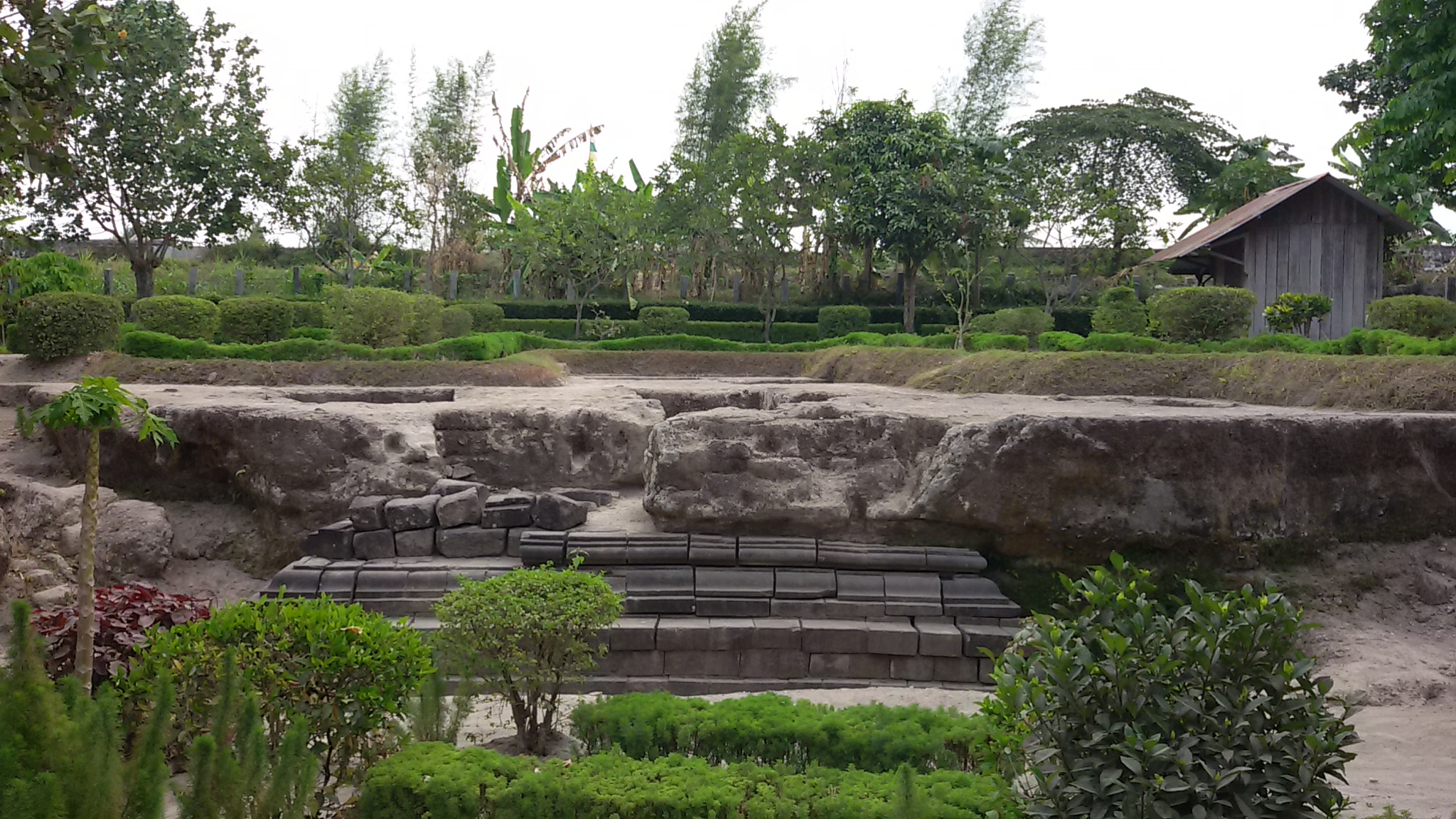
Kadisoka Temple in 2015

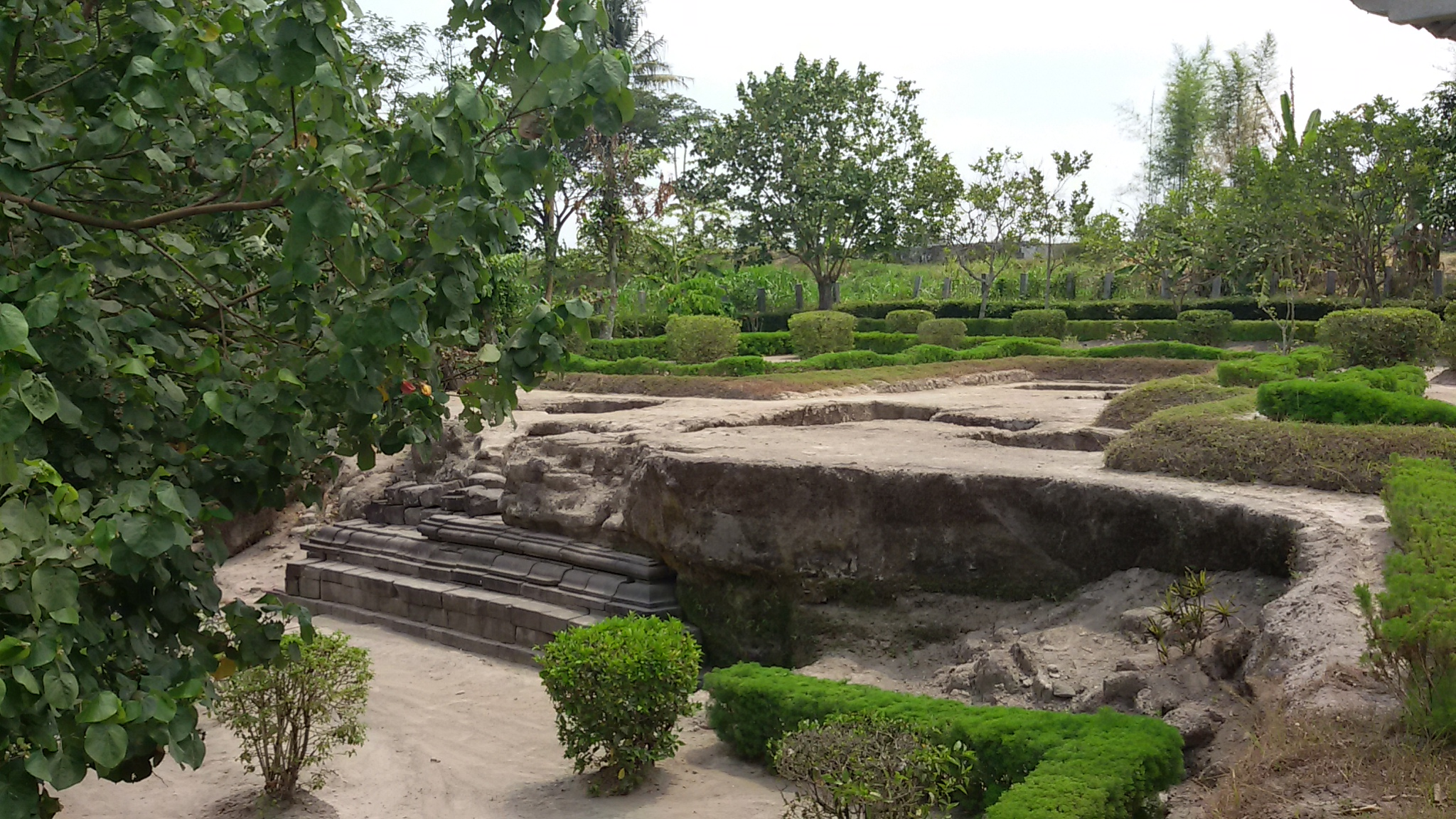
Kadisoka Temple in 2015

Kadisoka is thought to have been built around the eighth century. According to Véronique Degroot, it was not completed; she writes that only some five layers of the base were completed. It was buried by lahar flows running down the Kuning River on two separate occasions, thought to have been at least a century apart. The temple was eventually under 3 metres (9.8 ft) of earth.

The temple at Kadisoka is generally identified as a Hindu temple, based on the layout of the cella: in its centre archaeologists have found a pit, a feature thought only to be found in Hindu temples.

The temple was rediscovered by a sand miner on 7 December 2000 and reported to the Balai Pelestarian Peninggalan Purbakala (Department for the Preservation of Prehistoric Artefacts). After preliminary examinations looked promising, in February 2001 excavation began; it had soon uncovered the entirety of the temple's eastern foundation as well as the temple pit. Within the pit excavators found some semi-precious stones, gold, and a box containing a gold plaque engraved with a lotus flower. As of 2010 the majority of the temple remains buried.

== Works cited ==
- Data Benda Cagar Budaya/Situs yang Dipelihara [Data of Cultural Property/Maintained Site] (report) (in Indonesian), Jakarta: Directorate of Prehistoric Artefacts, 2010
- Degroot, Véronique (2009). Candi, Space and Landscape: A Study on the Distribution, Orientation and Spatial Organization of Central Javanese Temple Remains. Leiden: Sidestone Press. ISBN 978-90-8890-039-6.
