= Venus de Brizet =

Marble sculpture of Venus

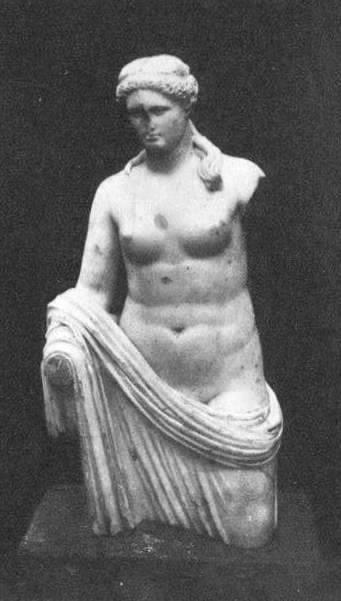
The Venus de Brizet

The Venus de Brizet is a marble sculpture of Venus (Aphrodite to the Greeks), discovered in a field in Saint-Just-sur-Loire, in Loire, France), in 1937.

Originally thought to be an ancient Roman work, it was classified as a historical monument (monument historique) in 1938, before it was revealed that it was actually sculpted in 1936 and buried the same year by an artist who imagined the hoax for advertising purposes.

== History ==
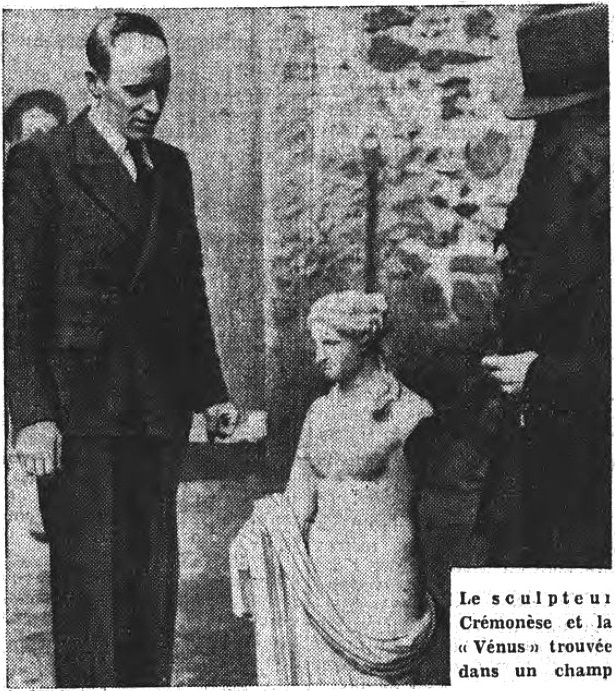
Cremonese next to the statue (mid-December 1938)

The statue was discovered on April 28, 1937, in the hogback of Brizet, a mound to the east of the village Etrat. Ploughing his field, Forez farmer Jean Gonon discovered a statue buried half a metre from the surface. It was 86 cm and weighed 87 kilograms. It depicted a female, half-draped, with nose, right hand, left arm and lower torso broken off.

Gonon notified an amateur archaeologist, Jean Renaud, a member of the local learned society the Diana de Montbrison. At the time, the society was chaired by Noël Thiollier, regional curator of historical monuments. On the basis of photographs sent by another member of the society, the Hellenist Mario Meunier, former secretary of Rodin, experts such as Adrien Blanchet, member of the Académie des Inscriptions et Belles-Lettres, and Alexandre Philadelpheus, director of the Athens National Archaeological Museum, the statue was dated to the end of the 2nd century CE (the hairstyle reminiscent of the Empress Faustine the Younger) and it was thought that the neo-Attic Venus Anadyomene was a Roman copy of a Greek Aphrodite.

Informed by Thiollier, the magazine L'illustration mentioned the statue in its issue of June 19, 1937. It mentioned the name of the ancient sculptor Phidias. Relayed by many newspapers and magazines, this discovery made a national impact. Less than a year later, the Journal officiel de la République française (Official Journal of the French Republic) of May 18, 1938, announced that the Venus de Brizet was classified as a historical monument.

As early as November 1938, a journalist from the magazine Reflets said was the work of a young artist of Italian origin from Saint-Etienne, Francois Cremonese (1907–2002). He carved the statue in Tuscan marble (after a plaster maquette modelled on a young Polish woman, Anna Studnicka). He buried his creation on October 9, 1936, without the knowledge of Gonon, to prepare a hoax to publicise his talent. To convince Thiollier and Meley, curator of the museum of Saint-Etienne, Cremonese revealed the missing pieces in December 1938 and adhered them to the statue.

It was declassified by decree of October 21, 1939, but the Venus was not returned to its creator, with Gonon remaining the owner by court decision of May 26, 1939.

== Bibliography ==
- Marguerite Fournier, Vénus chez Thémis, Village de Forez, n^{o} January 25, 1986.
- Jean Renaud, Vénus chez Thémis, Bulletin de la Diana, Montbrison, t. XXVI, n^{o} 2, 1937, p. 181–188.
- Jean Tibi, L'œuvre brisée de Francesco Crémonèse – Gloire et misère de la Vénus de Brizet (1937–1999), Bulletin du Vieux Saint-Étienne, n^{o} 196, 1999, p. 5–90.
