= Death and state funeral of Abulfaz Elchibey =

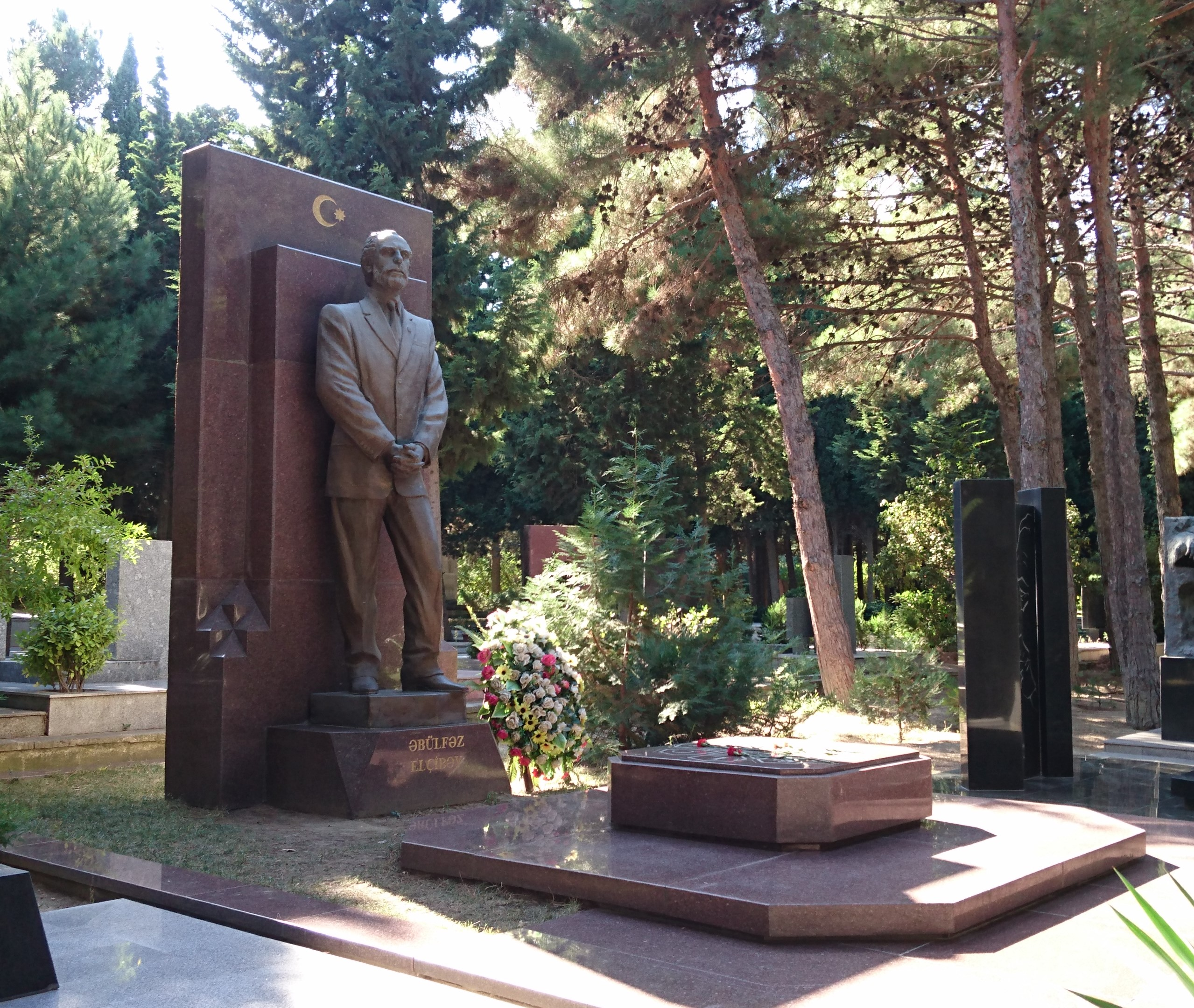
Tomb of Elchibey in the Alley of Honor

Abulfaz Elchibey, the second President of Azerbaijan, died on 22 August 2000 of cancer and received a state funeral in Baku attended by then-President of Azerbaijan Heydar Aliyev. Elchibey was buried at the Alley of Honor in Baku. The funeral was attended by about 50,000 people who carried Elchibey's coffin on their arms. Obituaries for Elchibey were published in The Guardian, The Washington Post, The New York Times and elsewhere.

== Death ==
In July 2000, Elchibey had been rushed unconscious to Turkey for medical treatment. On 22 August, Elchibey died at the age of 62 at Gulhane Military Medical Academy Hospital in Ankara, where he was receiving medical treatment from advanced prostate cancer. According to doctors, he was also suffering from diabetes and infections. According to people close to Elchibey, having understood his grave state, the day before death he asked to be transported to Baku where he wished to die, but that was not done in time. On the evening of 22 August his body was flown to Baku.

Western obituaries for Elchibey noted him as being the first democratically elected president of Azerbaijan and as a secular moderniser.

== Funeral ==
The state funeral in Baku was organized on 23 August by Azerbaijani government led by Speaker of Parliament, Murtuz Alasgarov. An official mourning was not declared, but people displayed Elchibey's portraits and Azerbaijani flags with mourning ribbons. From early morning, thousands of people began to gather at Elchibey's house and at the headquarters of the Popular Front of Azerbaijan, which had been chaired by Elchibey until his death. At noon, a farewell ceremony began at the headquarters and was attended by Elchibey's political associates. Then the coffin with Elchibey's body was moved to the Academy of Sciences of Azerbaijan where in the 1970s and 1980s Elchibey had worked as a researcher. Elchibey's supporters refused the government's offer to move to the Academy of Sciences by buses, opting instead to carry the coffin with their arms. Several thousands people chanted "Elchibey! Elchibey!" and sung the Azerbaijani anthem.

Eulogies were delivered by Murtuz Alasgarov and Azerbaijani opposition leaders. The chairman of the Musavat party, Isa Gambar, compared Elchibey to George Washington and Mustafa Kemal Atatürk, saying that "only in the future will we understand who we lost".

During the funeral ceremony more than 10,000 people started chanting against Heydar Aliyev when he entered the building to attend the ceremony. He quickly left the building and faced further taunts from more than 50,000 people outside. Aliyev's security guards reportedly had to hold back the crowd to enable Aliyev to leave. In the past, Elchibey had described Aliyev as "an autocrat playing at democracy" while Aliyev claimed that Elchibey was "unequal to the demands of building a fledgling state". Elchibey also denounced the 1993 Azerbaijani presidential election, where Aliyev cemented his power, as fraudulent. Nonetheless, Aliyev admitted that Elchibey "was a decent man".
