= Persian Princess =

Archaeological hoax

- Died: c. 1996 (aged approximately 21–25)
- Other name: Persian Mummy
- Known for: Modern woman's mummified remains presented as those of an ancient Persian princess in an archaeological forgery discovered in 2000

The Persian Princess or Persian Mummy is a mummy of an alleged Persian princess who surfaced in Pakistani Baluchistan in October 2000. After considerable attention and further investigation, the mummy proved to be an archaeological forgery and possibly a murder victim.

== Discovery ==
The body that became known as the Persian Princess was located on 19 October 2000 at the home of tribal leader Wali Mohammed Reeki in Kharan, Balochistan, near the border with Afghanistan. Pakistani authorities located the mummy during a murder investigation after receiving a videotape in which Ali Aqbar offered a mummy for sale. During questioning, Aqbar directed police to Reeki's home.

Reeki told investigators that he had acquired the mummy from an Iranian man, Sharif Shah Bakhi, who claimed to have found it after an earthquake near Quetta, the provincial capital of Balochistan. Before it came into police custody, the mummy had reportedly been offered for sale on the black antiquities market for 600 million Pakistani rupees (approximately US$11 million in 2000).

== Description ==
The Persian Princess was found wrapped in bandages and placed inside a gilded anthropoid wooden coffin, which rested within a carved stone sarcophagus sealed with a heavy stone lid. Both the coffin and the stone covering bore Old Persian cuneiform inscriptions, and the coffin was decorated with a large image of the Faravahar.

The woman wore a gold crown, a gold face mask and a gold chest plate. An inscription on the chest plate identified her as Rhodogune, a daughter of the Achaemenid king Xerxes I. The body rested on a layer described as wax and honey.

== Initial identification ==
On 26 October 2000, one week after the mummy was discovered, Pakistani archaeologist Ahmad Hasan Dani announced that he believed it to be the remains of an ancient Persian princess. Based on the Old Persian inscription on the gold chest plate, Dani identified the woman as Rhodogune, whom he believed to be a daughter of Xerxes I, who ruled the Achaemenid Empire from 486 to 465 BCE.

Dani believed the mummy represented the first authenticated ancient Persian mummy. At the time, mummification was not known to have been practised in the Achaemenid Empire, which ruled much of the ancient Near East from about 550 to 330 BCE. He suggested that the woman may have died in Ancient Egypt before being returned to Persia for burial.

The announcement attracted international attention from archaeologists, museums and the news media. If authentic, the discovery would have represented the first known ancient Persian mummy.

== Competing claims ==
In late October 2000, after the mummy had been identified as the remains of an Achaemenid princess, competing claims arose over where it should be kept. The Iranian Cultural Heritage Organization demanded that the mummy be returned to Iran, arguing that it was the remains of a member of the Achaemenid royal family. Pakistan's Archaeological Department rejected the request, maintaining that the mummy belonged to Pakistan because it had been discovered within the country's borders.

As news of the discovery spread, additional claims followed. The Taliban asserted that the mummy had been removed illegally from Afghanistan. Residents of Quetta called for it to be returned to their city. The Awan tribe also claimed the mummy, arguing that the inscription identified the woman as a member of the House of Hika Munshi, which they regarded as an Awan royal lineage, and requested that it be transferred to the Kallar Kahar Fossil Museum.

In November 2000, while the competing claims remained unresolved, the mummy was placed on public display at the National Museum of Pakistan in Karachi.

== Investigation ==
As international interest in the Persian Princess grew, experts began examining whether the mummy was genuine. Earlier in 2000, several months before the mummy came to public attention, American archaeologist Oscar White Muscarella was approached by intermediaries acting for an antiquities dealer in Pakistan who claimed they wished to sell the body of a daughter of Xerxes I. When a fragment of the coffin underwent radiocarbon dating, it was found to be only about 250 years old. Muscarella concluded that the mummy was a forgery. "I smelled a rat," he later recalled. He broke off contact and alerted Interpol through the Federal Bureau of Investigation.

After the mummy was taken into police custody in October 2000, Asma Ibrahim, curator of the National Museum of Pakistan, noticed features that immediately raised doubts about its authenticity. The body showed fungal growth on the face, a sign of recent decomposition, and the woven mat beneath it was only a few years old.

The inscriptions also raised doubts. Iranian philologist Rüdiger Schmitt found numerous grammatical errors and determined that parts of the text had been copied from the Behistun inscription, a royal inscription commissioned by Darius the Great, rather than from an original royal funerary text. Schmitt also noted that the inscription used the Greek form Rhodogune instead of the expected Old Persian Wardegauna for the princess's name.

CT scans and X-rays performed at Aga Khan University Hospital in Karachi provided further evidence that the mummy was modern. The heart had been removed with the other internal organs, although ancient Egyptian embalmers normally left it in place. Soft tissues that would not be expected to survive for more than two millennia also remained intact.

== Identity ==
On 17 April 2001, Asma Ibrahim published the results of her investigation into the body. She concluded that the "Persian Princess" was a modern woman between about 21 and 25 years of age who had died around 1996, approximately five years before the mummy came to public attention.

Ibrahim also found evidence that the woman's body had been altered after death to resemble an ancient mummy. Her teeth had been removed, and her hip joint, pelvis and backbone damaged before the body cavity was filled with powder. Ibrahim concluded that the woman had probably died after receiving a severe blow to the lower back or pelvis, possibly after being struck by a vehicle.

In 2004, a study using accelerator mass spectrometry confirmed that the body was of modern origin, independently verifying that it was not an ancient Achaemenid burial.

Following the forensic findings, Pakistani police investigated the woman's death as a possible murder and arrested several suspects in Balochistan.

== Burial ==
The Edhi Foundation took custody of the body, and on 5 August 2005, announced that it was to be interred with proper burial rites. However, police and other government officials never responded to numerous requests, and it was not until 2008 that the foundation finally carried out the burial.

== Representations in contemporary art ==
The Persian Princess is the name of an exhibition presented in August 2016 in Jerusalem, by artist Hili Greenfeld. The exhibition functions as a tribute to the anonymous woman who, in an instant, went from the status of a princess in a gold-plated coffin displayed in a national museum, to the victim of a vicious murder in whom everyone quickly lost interest. The extreme transformation of the perception of the archeological object – from an honored Princess to a woman who was murdered – is what interests Greenfeld.

Greenfeld picked up the signs and symbols used by the forgers, such as engraved rosettes, cypress gold, the icon of Ahura Mazda, and gold crowns. She painted the symbols on artificial grass, and created a hybrid of lyrical abstract paintings, Persian rugs and graffiti murals. The works that are shown on the walls and on the floor seem to be graffiti murals and then seem to be rugs, but in both cases they are synthetic imitations of the original.

== See also ==
- List of unsolved murders (2000–present)
