= Kaleemullah Lashari =

Pakistani archaeologist, historian and author

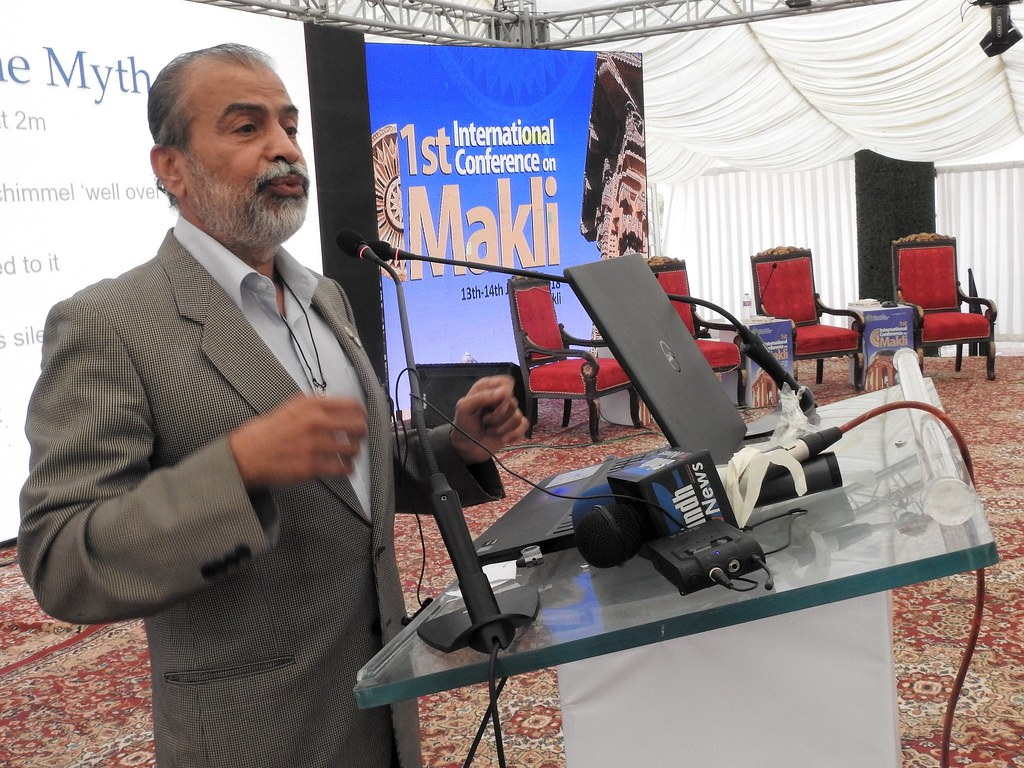
- Lashari addresses the International Makli Conference
- Born: 3 June 1953; Larkana, Sindh, Pakistan
- Citizenship: Pakistan
- Education: University of Wisconsin–Madison, University of Karachi
- Known for: Research on the Indus Valley Civilization
- Awards: Sitara-e-Imtiaz
- Scientific career
- Fields: Archaeology, history, literature, conservation science (cultural heritage)
- Website: https://kaleemullahlashari.org/

Kaleemullah Lashari (Sindhi: ڊاڪٽر ڪليم الله لاشاري) (Urdu: ڈاکٹر کلیم اللہ لاشاری, b. 3 June 1953) is a Pakistani archaeologist, historian and author. In March 2019, the government of Pakistan awarded him the Sitara-i-Imtiaz, the third highest civilian award in Pakistan. He works to preserve the cultural heritage of Pakistan.

== Early life ==
He was born on 3 June 1953 in Larkana, Sindh, Pakistan, to Mohammad Ali Johar, a teacher and Sindhi-language poet.

== Education ==
Lashari got his primary education from a government school in Larkana. He obtained a master's degree in Arts from the University of Karachi in 1993. In 2002 Lashari got a DAAD Fellowship (post doctoral research) at the Museum of Islamic Arts, Berlin, Germany in Islamic Period Archaeology. In 2006 he got a post-doctoral fellowship from the University of Wisconsin–Madison, United States.

== Career ==
Lashari started his professional career in 1985 as assistant commissioner after passing the Federal Public Service Commission of Pakistan. He occupied administrative posts in various provinces of Pakistan. He retired in 2013, when he was provincial secretary to the government of Sindh in the department of antiquities.

== Affiliations ==
Lashari is serving as chair of committees of heritage and conservation and restoration of cultural heritage, including: Technical Consultative Committee, National Fund for Mohenjo-daro, Central Records Management Committee, Government of Sindh, Management Board for Antiquities & Physical Heritage, Government of Sindh, Advisory Committee for Museum of Epigraphy, Karachi, Sindh Exploration and Adventure Society; and is a Patron of Sukkur Historical Society. He is a member of boards and committees that protect the physical heritage of Pakistan.

== Publications ==
Lashari has written books on archaeology, history and literature. His books are:

- Epigraphy of Makli, SEAS Pakistan, Karachi (2018) (ISBN 9789699432033)
- Something of Past, Committee for International Conference on Mohenjodaro; Culture, Tourism & Antiquities Department, Government of Sindh, Karachi. (2017)
- Study of Stone Carved Graves, Directorate of Archives, Sindh (R) (2012) (ISBN 9789699310065)
- Chaukandi aur Qabaili Qabrain, Department of Antiquities, & SEAS Pakistan, Karachi (2012)
- Unees Sau Tirasy, Academy Bazyaft, Karachi. (2011)
- Ishq Qayum Azhar: (Edt.) An anthology on Bedil, Yadgar Committee, Sukkur, (2001)
- Sukkur: History and Society, (Edt.), Sukkur Historical Society (2001)
- Study of Mural Ceramics of Sukkur, Sukkur Historical Society (2001)
- A Study of Stone Carved Graves, published by SEAS, Karachi, Pakistan (1996)
- Nineteen Eighty-three A collection of Sindhi Short Stories, published by the Mahran Publishers, Karachi, Pakistan.(1999)
- Study of Biographic Element in Letters, Sindhika Academy, Karachi, Pakistan (1994)

== Awards and recognition ==
- Sitara-i-Imtiaz (Star of Excellence) Award by the president of Pakistan in 2019 for his services to the nation.
