= Davenport Tablets =

Three inscribed slate tables found in the United States in the 1870s

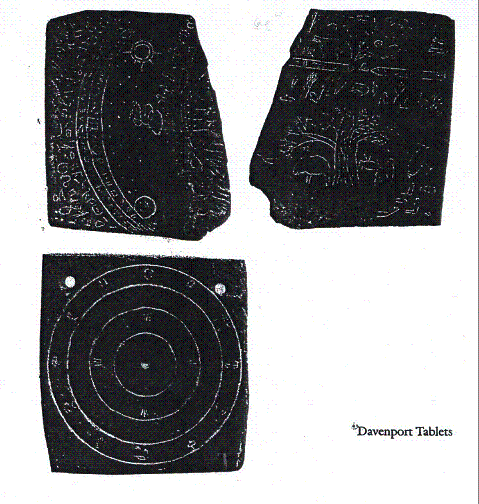
The 3 Davenport Tablets- Top Left: Cremation Scene, Top Right: Hunting Scene, Botton Left: Calendar

The Davenport Tablets are three inscribed slate tablets found in mounds near Davenport, Iowa on January 10, 1877, and January 30, 1878. If these tablets were real, they would have been proof for the argument that the people who built the Native American mounds, called the Mound Builders were an ancient race of settlers. The Davenport Tablets were originally considered authentic, though opinion shifted after 1885 and they are now considered a hoax.

The tablets were found in mounds along with other items such as human skeletons, copper axes, and copper beads. One tablet represents a cremation scene, the second represents a hunting scene and the last is a calendar. The tablets had a total of 74 letters, deducting 24 repetitions. However, the letters were in a random order which could not be properly interpreted.

Even as the tablets were being examined, people questioned their authenticity. The tablets appeared to be in mint condition which would not have been the case if they had been buried for a long period of time. The site where the tablets were found revealed evidence someone had dug into the mound and placed the tablets. Because if the tablets had been untouched for many years, then the soil would have solidified around them rather than remaining loose.

== Discovery ==
The first two tablets were discovered on January 10, 1877, at the site known as Cook's Farm by local clergyman the Reverend Jacob Gass, while he was engaged in an emergency excavation due to the imminent transfer of the access rights. They were found in one of the mounds on the site, Mound No. 3. In an excavation a year later (the access rights having been restored), Charles Harrison, the president of the Davenport Academy of Natural Sciences, while excavating there with Gass, found a third tablet in Mound No. 11, which was near where the two previous tablets were discovered. They are often associated in discussions with a pipe found by Gass and another Lutheran minister, the Reverend Ad Blumer in 1880 in a separate group of mounds, referred to as the 'elephant pipe' by Gass. Blumer gave the pipe to the academy and shortly after his donation, the academy acquired a similar pipe from Gass which he reported had been found by a farmer in Louisa County, Iowa. Charles Putnam wrote a vindication of these artifacts in 1885.

=== Mound No. 3 ===
==== Grave A ====
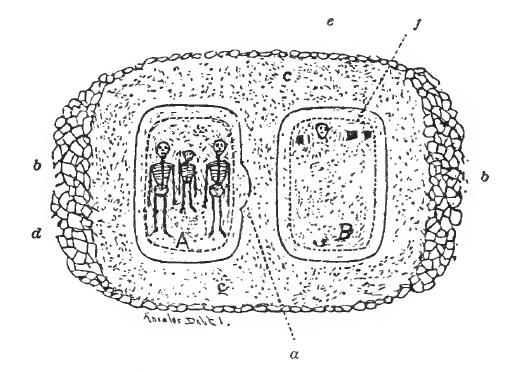
Mound No. 3 shown with Grave A and Grave B

As Gass continued digging in Mound No. 3, he came across three human skeletons- two adults and one child, five copper axes wrapped in cloth, and copper beads. The child skeleton was found in between the two others 5 1/2 feet below the surface. Above the skeletons lay a thick layer of shells and a sloping layer of shells. Two years before the discovery of the tablets, Dr. Farquharson said that previously "there were no layers of stones nor shells" in the mounds .

==== Grave B ====
The first two tablets were found in Grave B. Mounds are typically constructed in layers, however the arch in this grave indicated that at some point the mound was disrupted. In the middle of the grave was a layer of stones. The grave is 6 feet wide and 10 feet long and dug about 2.5 feet in depth. This information alone suggested how easy it would be to insert the tablets at the bottom without displacing other articles in the grave.

After the discovery of the tablets, Gass came back and removed some remaining articles in the grave such as scattered skeleton parts, a copper axe, copper beads, pottery fragments, and yellow pigment. Farquharson examined the tablets and noticed, based on their original smooth markings, the tablets had not been subjected to much weathering.

=== Mound No.11 ===
While the owners of Cook's Farm were plowing, unusual stones were found and Gass visited the mounds again. During this excavation he discovered more stones with ancient engravings along with the last tablet. On May 15 he found five inscribed stones, two of which are in a museum and the other three were too large to remove.

== Debunking the Tablets ==
The Davenport Tablets were sent to the Bureau of American Ethnology in the Smithsonian Institution to be studied further from 1877 to 1885. Initially the authenticity of the Davenport artifacts was not questioned in informal preliminary reports and opinions by academics including Lewis H Morgan. Spencer Baird, secretary of the Smithsonian Institution, assigned the task of making a preliminary study to Dr. E. Foreman, an assistant. Foreman's preliminary response was that they were not ancient. This was followed by a nine page report which raised questions as to their authenticity such as unweathered incisions and a perfect circle probably drawn with a steel compass. A debate escalated between those at The Davenport Academy and the Smithsonian Institution regarding whether the Davenport Tablets were real or fake. From the pages of minor scholarly journals to the foremost news in the journal Science, eventually the tablets' authenticity fell under the criticism of the new Smithsonian spokesman, Cyrus Thomas. Thomas lambasted them as "anomalous waifs," which had absolutely no supporting, or contextual, evidence to aide in their authenticity. University of Iowa Professor Marshall McKusick now refers to the find and the circumstances surrounding it as "The Davenport Conspiracy". McKusick suggested the tablets were modified roof tiles stolen off the Old Slate House, a house of prostitutes.

== Interpretations ==
In McKusick's 1991 book, The Davenport Conspiracy Revisited, McKusick asserts that Gass may have been the victim of an ill-advised joke played on him by fellow Davenport Academy members, who were possibly motivated by their jealousy of a foreign-born outsider in their midst. In 1874 Gass had made important discoveries of beautiful and complex Native American art at the Cook farm, such as copper axes. The level of technical ability and artistic craftsmanship by ancient Native Americans was evident in these artifacts. At a time when archeological enthusiasts digging along the Mississippi River in Iowa and Illinois were turning up nothing, Gass had the luck of hitting a genuine archaeological jackpot. However, after that date it is questionable as to what the motives of his academic rivals and relatives might have been.

Another explanation for the dubious origins of the artifacts might involve the credibility of Gass himself. It is believed Gass dealt in fake Native American effigy pipes, such as the many examples illustrated in The Davenport Conspiracy Revisited. Genuine effigy pipes are a testament to the creative abilities of the ancient Native American Indians, but their counterfeits are of poor quality. Made of shale, clay, and limestone, these frauds were often traded amongst Gass and his colleagues, many ending up in the Davenport Academy museum. However, it is possible Gass himself was not the perpetrator of these fakes, but was influenced by people jealous of his abilities and good luck in selecting excavation sites. In this case, it was his own relatives, Edwin Gass and Adolph Blumer who persuaded him to take these fakes seriously and trade them.

== See also ==
- Cardiff Giant
- Grave Creek Stone
- Mound Builders
- L'Anse aux Meadows
- Nomans Land (Massachusetts)
- Bat Creek inscription
- Turkey Mountain inscriptions
- Oklahoma runestones
- Viking Altar Rock
- Spirit Pond runestones
- Petroform
- Petroglyph
- Rock art
