= Brígido Lara =

Mexican forger

Brígido Lara (born 1939/40) is a Mexican artist and ex-forger of pre-Columbian antiques. Lara claims to have created perhaps as many as 40,000 pieces of forged pre-Columbian pottery.

Brígido Lara began to create forgeries in the 1950s and 1960s. He created many items in the style of the Mayans, Aztecs, and especially the lesser-known Totonacs — in fact, to such an extent that the majority of purported Totonac artifacts may actually be of his creation. He worked in a museum, where he was acquainted with both original artifacts and potential customers.

Lara sold his work as genuine Mexican antiquities; buyers did not ask many questions since they were buying contraband — taking antiquities out of Mexico is illegal. Some of the works were sold to the Morton D. May collection and the Metropolitan Museum of Art, dated AD 400–700 and attributed to the Remojadas culture in Veracruz. In 1971, the Los Angeles County Museum of Natural History presented a large exhibition entitled "Ancient Art of Veracruz." Lara later recognized many of the exhibits as his work.

In July 1974, Mexican police arrested a group of what appeared to be antique smugglers, with Brígido Lara among them. An antiquities expert declared Lara's forgeries genuine. While serving his prison sentence, Lara requested fresh clay, and to prove his innocence, he created just the items he was accused of smuggling. The same antique expert declared them genuine as well. Lara was released in January 1975.

The Xalapa Museum of Anthropology later hired Lara as a restorer and to recognize forgeries.

In 1987, Brígido Lara told his story to two journalists from Connoisseur magazine. Through them, the St. Louis Art Museum heard that their Morton D. May collection contained his forgeries. The Dallas Museum of Art and the Metropolitan Museum of Art also realized they had Lara forgeries in their collections, though they initially claimed that there was no proof. In 1999, he was featured in the documentary film "Ruins," directed by Jesse Lerner. The film screened at the Sundance Film Festival and in many museums around the world, giving him further exposure.

Lara continues to sculpt in ancient styles but now signs his work and is a licensed maker of replicas. He calls his previous forgeries "his originals" or "original interpretations".
