= Kiʻi =

Hawaiian religious image and figure

A kiʻi is a religious image from Hawaiʻi that can hold the presence of a god summoned into it. Kiʻi is also the first man in Hawaiian religion. The Hawaiian "kiʻi" is the cognate of the Māori term "tiki", which also denotes the first man as well as an anthropomorphic religious image.

== Religious images ==
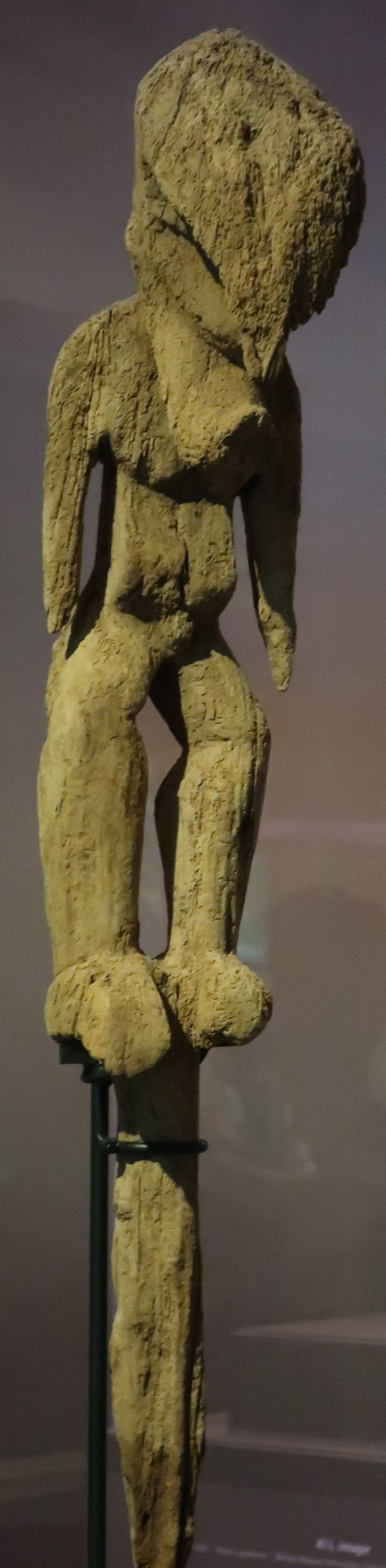
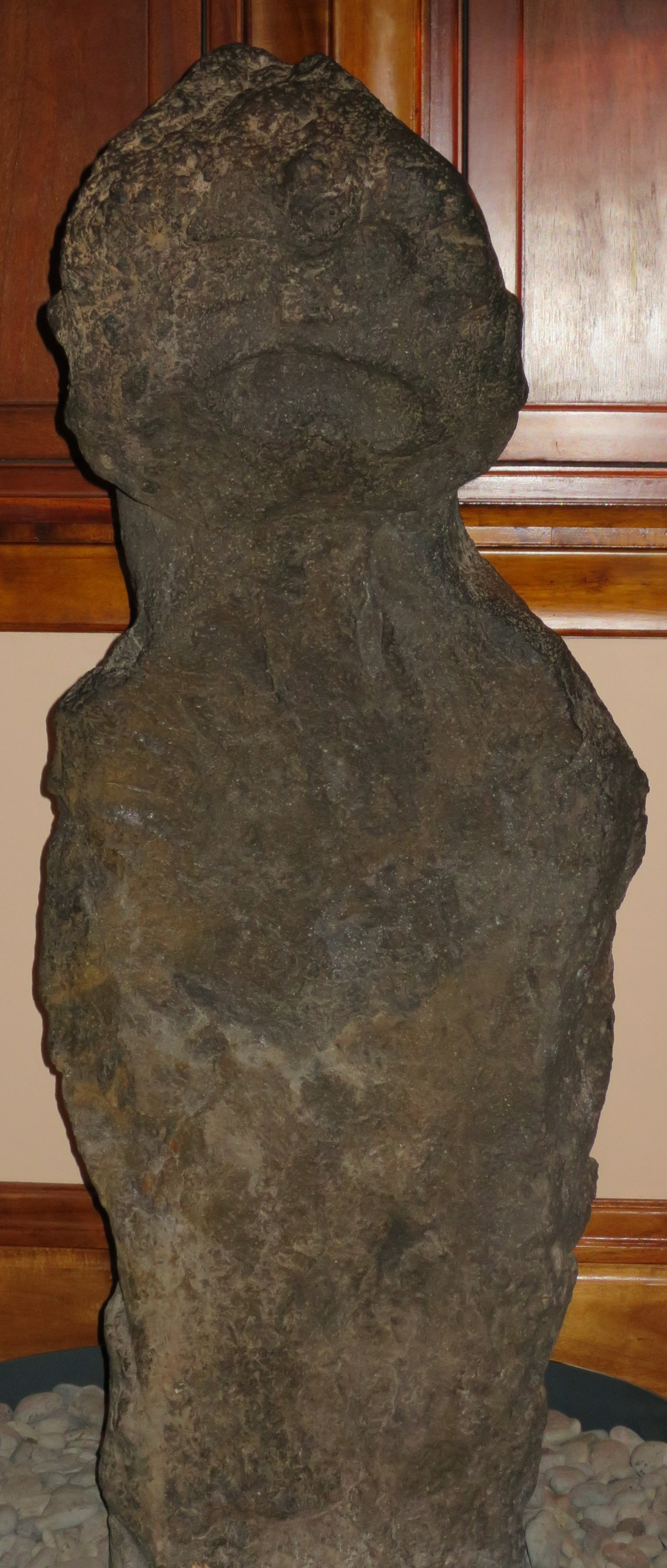
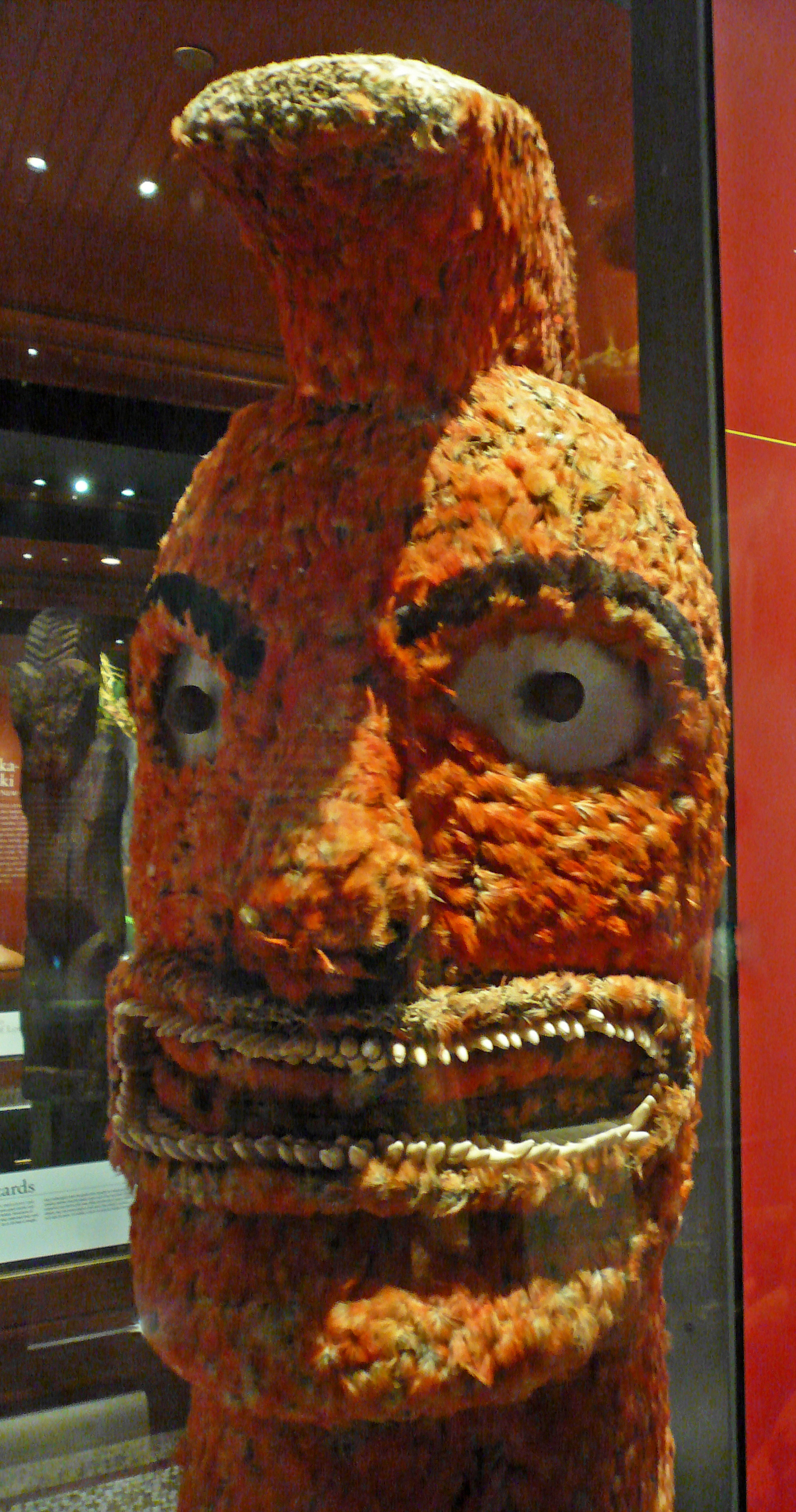
Kiʻi at the Bishop Museum, of various materials. Left to right: a wooden image from a cave on Maui, carved of kou (Cordia); Kāneikokala, a stone kiʻi pōhaku; and a feathered image displayed as the war god Kūkāʻilimoku

A god could be either called on without using an image or summoned into an object. An object used this way gained mana ('power') and kept some of it so the god could be called back there again, even generations later.

The images were made from natural materials, including wood, stone, and feathers. Anthropologist Adrienne L. Kaeppler argued that before European contact, feathered kiʻi were more important than wooden ones because their creation required the cooperation of several levels of society and depended on genealogical ties, whereas a single artisan could produce a wooden image.

Kaeppler reported in 1993 that three types of wood were believed to have been used to make kiʻi: ʻōhiʻa lehua (Metrosideros polymorpha), kauila (Alphitonia ponderosa and Colubrina oppositifolia), and possibly lama (Diospyros sandwicensis), and that laboratory analysis had contradicted this. A 2020 laboratory study of 135 Hawaiian figure carvings identified more than 18 genera that had been used.

== Figure in the Kumulipo ==
In the Kumulipo, Kiʻi is a man born alongside the gods Kāne and Kanaloa, and the senior line of human chiefs descends from his firstborn. Martha Warren Beckwith wrote that the name means "image" and identified him with Tiʻi and Tiki, whom traditions across eastern Polynesia treat as the first man.
