= Pacific Insects =

- Discipline: Entomology
- Language: English

Publication details
- Former name: International Journal of Entomology
- History: 1959–1985
- Publisher: Entomology Department, Bishop Museum (United States)
- Frequency: Quarterly

Standard abbreviations
- ISO 4: Pac. Insects

Indexing
- CODEN: PFISAO
- ISSN: 0030-8714
- LCCN: 64050152
- OCLC no.: 1761674

Links
- Journal homepage

Pacific Insects was a quarterly peer-reviewed scientific journal published by the Entomology Department at the Bishop Museum from 1959 to 1982. It was renamed to International Journal of Entomology in 1983 and discontinued in 1985. It was the organ of the "Zoogeography and Evolution of Pacific Insects" program. It should not be confused with Pacific Insects Monograph, nor with the new International Journal of Entomology, published since 2010 by the International Society of Zoological Research.
