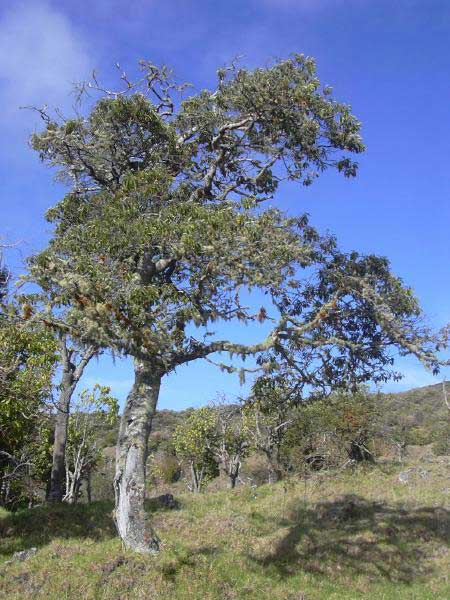

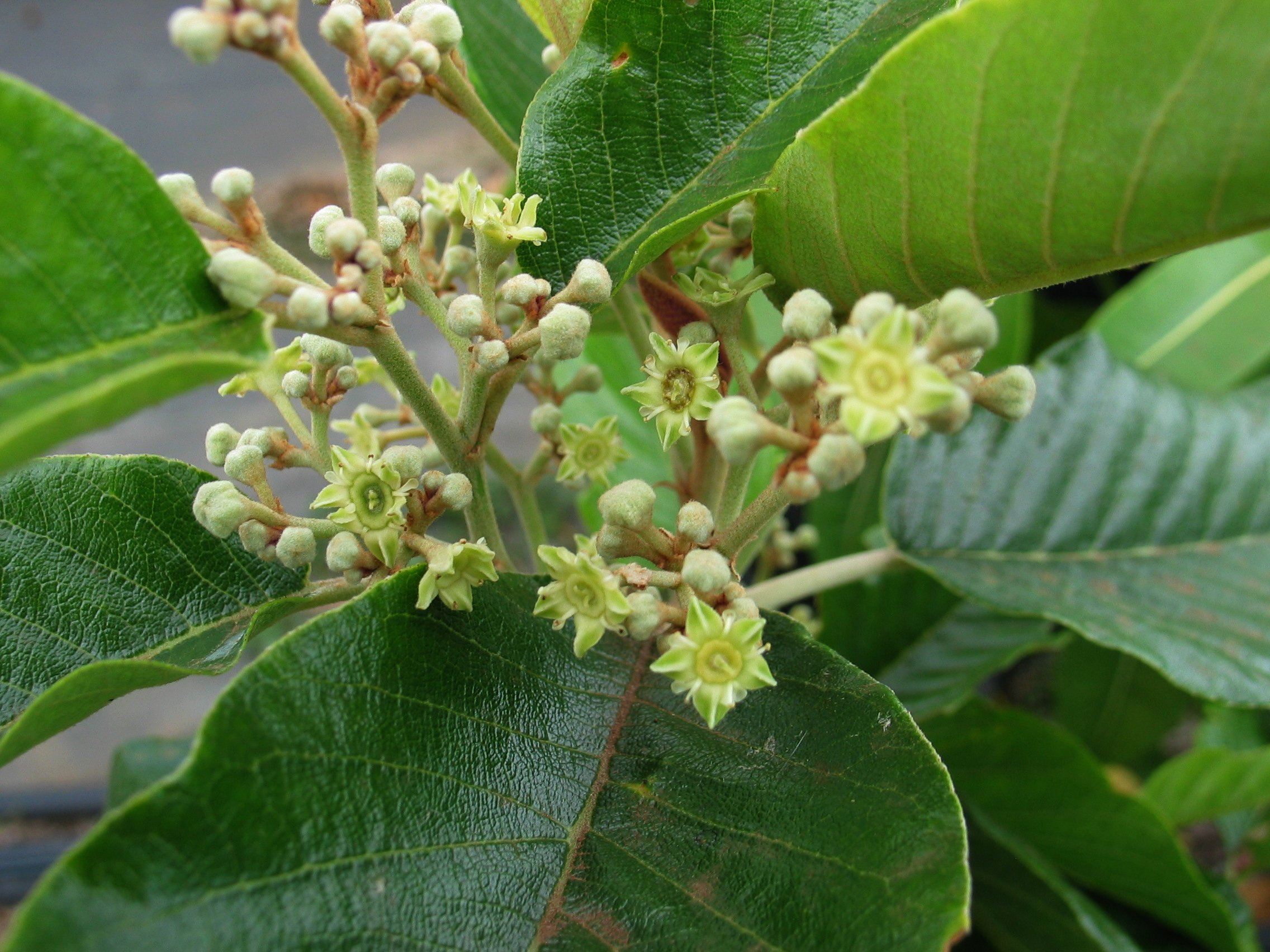
- Alphitonia ponderosa flower

Conservation status
- Vulnerable (IUCN 3.1)

Scientific classification
- Kingdom: Plantae
- Clade: Tracheophytes
- Clade: Angiosperms
- Clade: Eudicots
- Clade: Rosids
- Order: Rosales
- Family: Rhamnaceae
- Genus: Alphitonia
- Species: A. ponderosa

Binomial name
- Alphitonia ponderosa Hillebr.

= Alphitonia ponderosa =

Species of tree

Alphitonia ponderosa is a species of flowering tree in the family Rhamnaceae, that is endemic to the Hawaiian Islands. It is locally known as kauila, as is the related Colubrina oppositifolia.

== Description ==
Alphitonia ponderosa is a medium to large tree, reaching 15–24 m (49–79 ft) high with a trunk 20–60 cm (7.9–23.6 in) in diameter.

=== Leaves ===
The alternate leaves are ovate, 5–15 cm (2.0–5.9 in) long, and have 13–25-millimetre (0.51–0.98 in) petioles. The leaves are shiny, hairless, and green on the top, but are a dull light green with rust-colored veins on the bottom.

=== Flowers ===
Flowers of A. ponderosa are polygamous and form cymes at the bases of leaves. They are 6 mm (0.24 in) in diameter; the five sepals are 1.5 mm (0.059 in) and cover five 0.75-millimetre (0.030 in) petals.

=== Fruit ===
The fruit of A. ponderosa is a 15-millimetre (0.59 in) diameter drupe, which contain two to three seeds. The seeds are shiny, oblong, and have a red covering.

=== Habitat ===
Alphitonia ponderosa inhabits dry, coastal mesic, and mixed mesic forests at elevations of 240–1,250 m (790–4,100 ft) on all main islands, but is rare except on Kauaʻi. It grows as a shrub on exposed ridges.

== Uses ==
The reddish-brown wood of A. ponderosa is highly prized for its beauty, strength, and density. It was used as a replacement for metal by the Native Hawaiians, who made laʻau melomelo (fishing lures), pāhoa (daggers), ihe (short spears), pololū (long spears), ʻōʻō (digging sticks), hohoa (round kapa, beaters) ʻiʻe kūkū (square kapa beaters), leiomano (shark tooth clubs), and kiʻi (tiki carvings) with it.

== Conservation ==
Alphitonia ponderosa is considered a vulnerable species by the IUCN because of its fragmented distribution and declining population. Major threats include rats, pigs, deer, competition with introduced species of plants, and wildfire.

== See also ==
- Colubrina oppositifolia
- Kauila
