= Kāneikokala =

Hawaiian shark god and stone image

- Shark god
- Other names: Kane-i-kokala; Kaneikokala
- Venerated in: Hawaiian religion
- Symbol: Kōkala (porcupinefish)
- Region: Kahikinui, Maui

Kāneikokala (Note: The name translates to "Kāne in the kōkala fish".) (also Kane-i-kokala and Kaneikokala) is a Hawaiian shark god who was worshipped as an ʻaumakua (transl. ancestral guardian) in the Kahikinui district of Maui. According to Hawaiian mythology, he rescued people from canoe wrecks, and the kōkala (porcupinefish) was associated with him.

Kāneikokala is considered one of the most important manō kumupaʻa (transl. ancestral sharks), alongside Kūhaimoana, Kānehunamoku, Kauhuhu, and Kāmohoaliʻi.

A stone kiʻi ('religious image') of Kāneikokala stands in the Bishop Museum in Honolulu.

== Beliefs and practices ==
According to a Maui tradition, Kāneikokala and his sister were originally humans and members of the priesthood. Kāneikokala was "a confessor, a kahuna who forgives transgressions". After they died, they became protective shark ʻaumakua who help people resist evil.

Historian Samuel Kamakau wrote that when a canoe broke up at sea, a descendant of the ancestors who worshiped Kāneikokala could summon him for help. Kāneikokala would appear and return the survivors to their respective home island.

The kōkala was sacred to Kāneikokala. People of Kahikinui whose ancestors had worshiped him did not eat it and avoided it when it was being cooked.

== Bishop Museum stone ==
Pohaku Kāneikokala
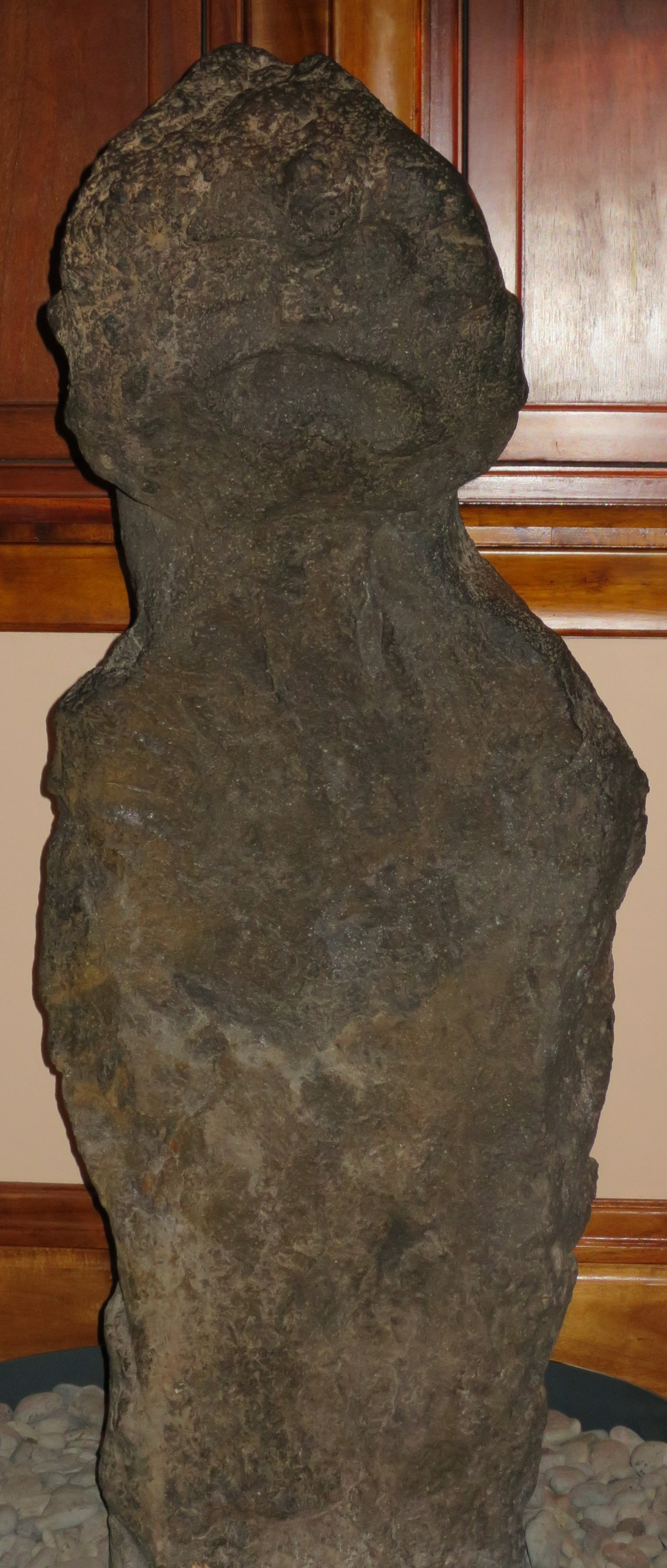
- Material: Vesicular basalt
- Height: 58 in (150 cm)
- Discovered: c. 1885; Kawaihae, Hawaiʻi
- Present location: Bishop Museum, Honolulu
- Culture: Native Hawaiian

A 58-inch (150 cm) stone image of Kāneikokala stands in Hawaiian Hall of the Bishop Museum in Honolulu. The figure has "a slightly kapa-kahi (transl. crooked) face".

For much of the 19th century, the stone lay buried at Kawaihae, on the island of Hawaiʻi, where it had been hidden to protect Kāneikokala at a time when images of Hawaiian gods were endangered. Around 1885, an old man named Wahinenui had dreams about Kāneikokala, who said he was cold and asked to be dug up. Wahinenui dug up the stone, and correctly predicted that he would die within three days. The stone came to the Bishop Museum in 1906 and was installed in the floor of Hawaiian Hall.

During the 2006–2009 restoration of Hawaiian Hall, museum staff tried to relocate the stone out of the hall but he "refused to be moved". Workers dug at the stone and brought in a jackhammer without reaching the base, until elders pointed out that no one had consulted Kāneikokala about the move. Ultimately, Kāneikokala remained in the hall.

== See also ==
- Hawaiian religion
- List of figures in the Hawaiian religion
