= Kauila =

Hawaiian name for two species of endemic tree

Kauila or Kauwila refers to two species of trees in the buckthorn family, Rhamnaceae, that are endemic to Hawaiʻi: Alphitonia ponderosa and Colubrina oppositifolia. Both species of wood are found distributed throughout the islands of Hawaiʻi; however, A. ponderosa was found on Kauaʻi, Oʻahu, Molokaʻi, Maui, and Hawaiʻi, whereas C. oppositifolia was found only on Maui, Oʻahu, and Hawaiʻi. The trees vary in size, with A. ponderosa reaching heights greater than 50 feet (15 m) while C. oppositifolia reaching 50 feet (15 m) or less. Likewise, the leaves of the trees are both different in appearance. A. ponderosa sprouts a dark-greenish color and a light yellow colored vein in each leaf, and C. oppositifolia grows a medium-green color leaf where the vein is a rusty orange/brown. The wood itself was prized for being extremely hard that it was often a substitute for metal, being so dense that it sinks in water. Although, C. oppositifolia was stated to be much tougher compared to its sister species. Though the rigid sturdiness varied between the species of wood, they were both prioritized in the making of tools, miscellaneous accessories, and crockeries. Kauila was among the woods used to carve kiʻi (religious images). Both occur in dry to mesic forest, and due to invasive weeds and animals that consume the plants, the Kauila trees are now rare; C. oppositifolia is listed as critically endangered and A. ponderosa is listed as vulnerable.

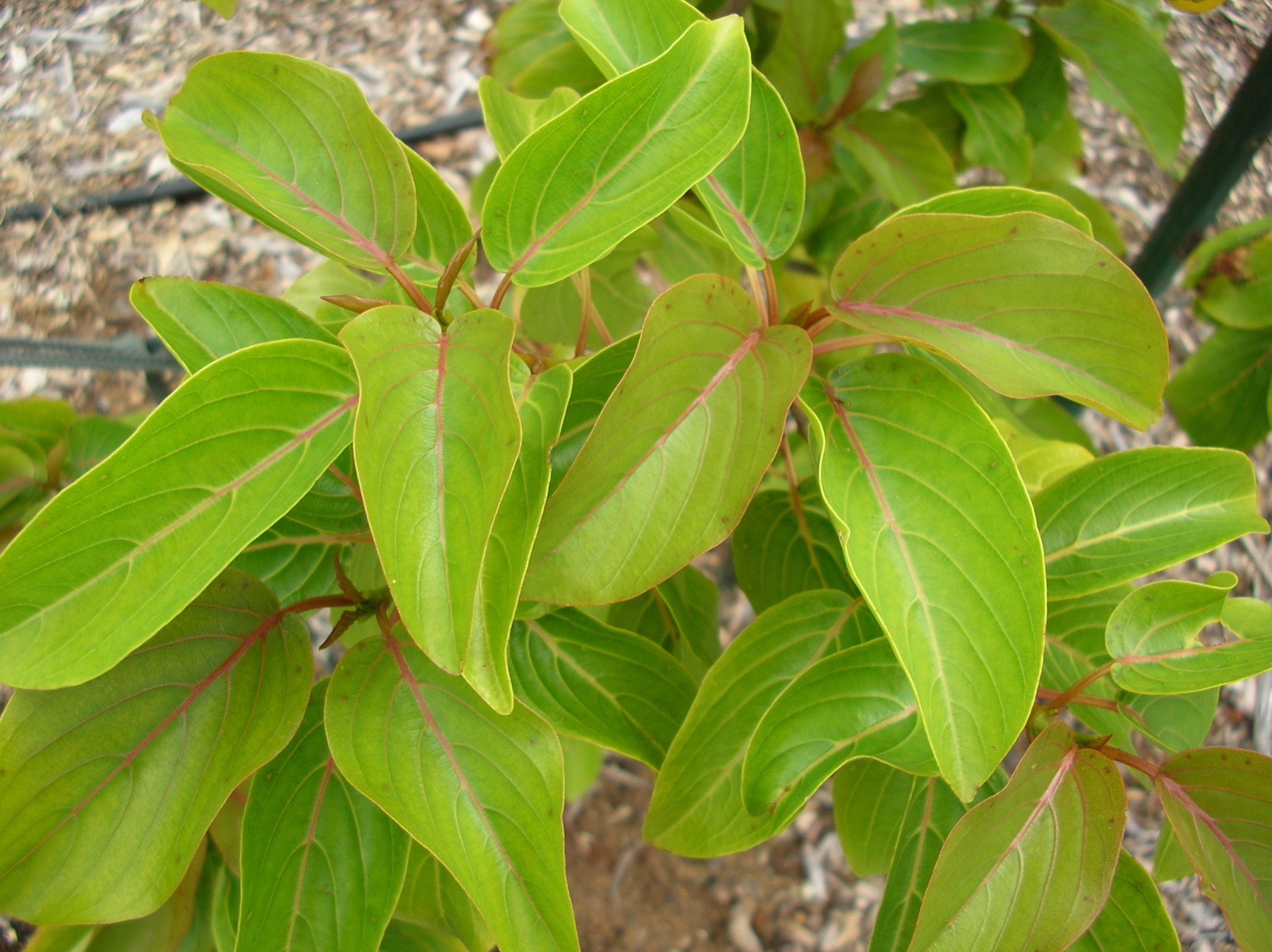
Leaves of a Colubrina oppositifolia tree

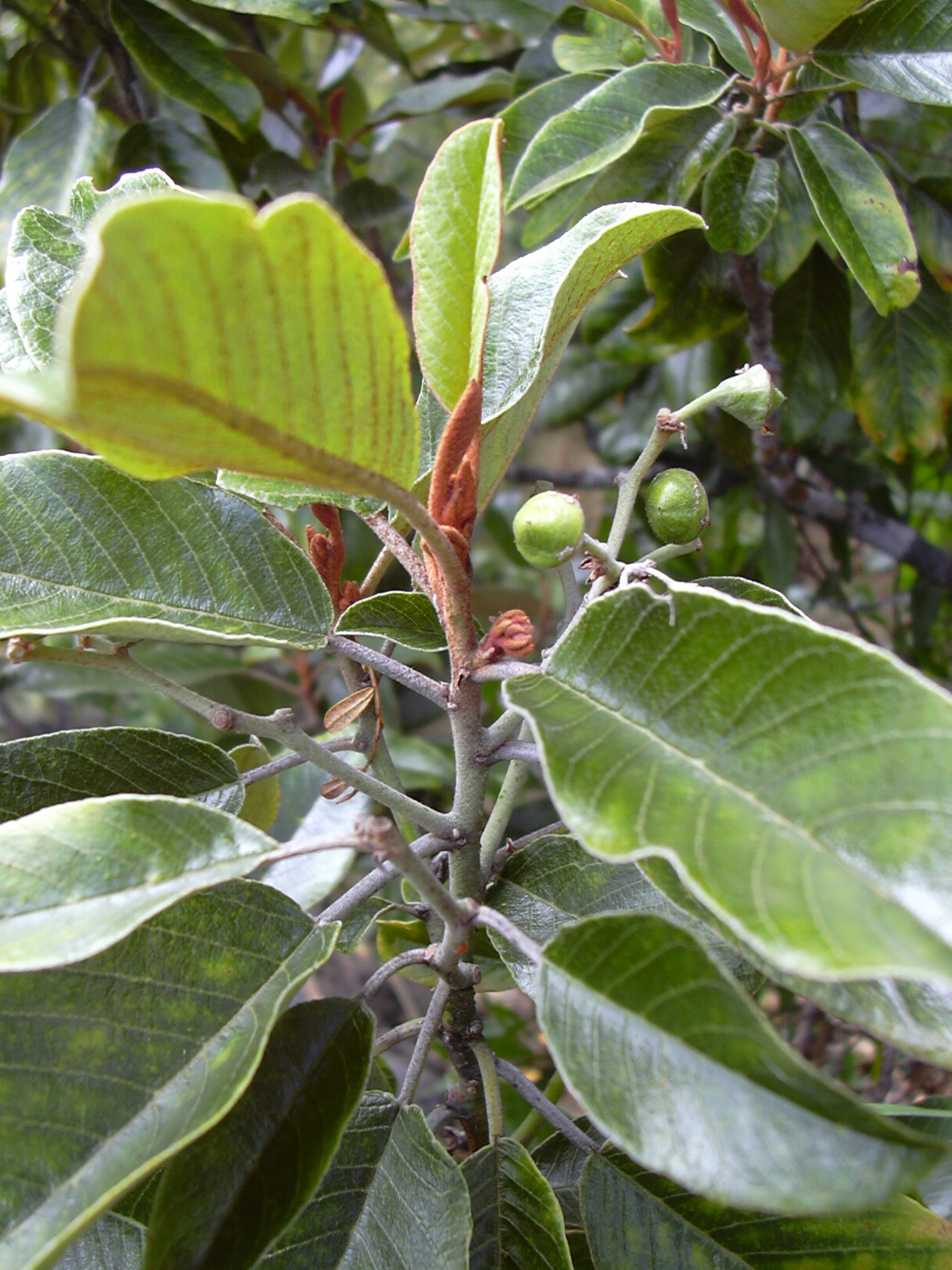
Leaves of an Alphitonia ponderosa tree

== History ==
The Kauila tree is named after the Hawaiian turtle goddess of the same name, Ka Wai Hu O Kauila ("rising waters of Kauila"). According to legends, she was born as the daughter of two magical turtles: the mother, Honupoʻokea, and the father, Honuʻea. It was described that the birth took place on the black sand beach of Punaluʻu, Kaʻū, on Hawaiʻi, where Honupoʻokea had dug her nest and laid a single egg. The color of the egg's dark and glossy shell was similar to the wood of the Kauila tree, thus granting the goddess her name. Her parents later dug into the earth to form a fresh spring beside her once she was born. Kauila became a symbol of protecting the keiki who visited her birthplace, occasionally shapeshifting into a young girl to watch over them. The powers received from her parents granted her the ability to give fresh water to the thirsty people and children of Kaʻū, deeming her a spiritual guardian, or an ʻaumakua.
