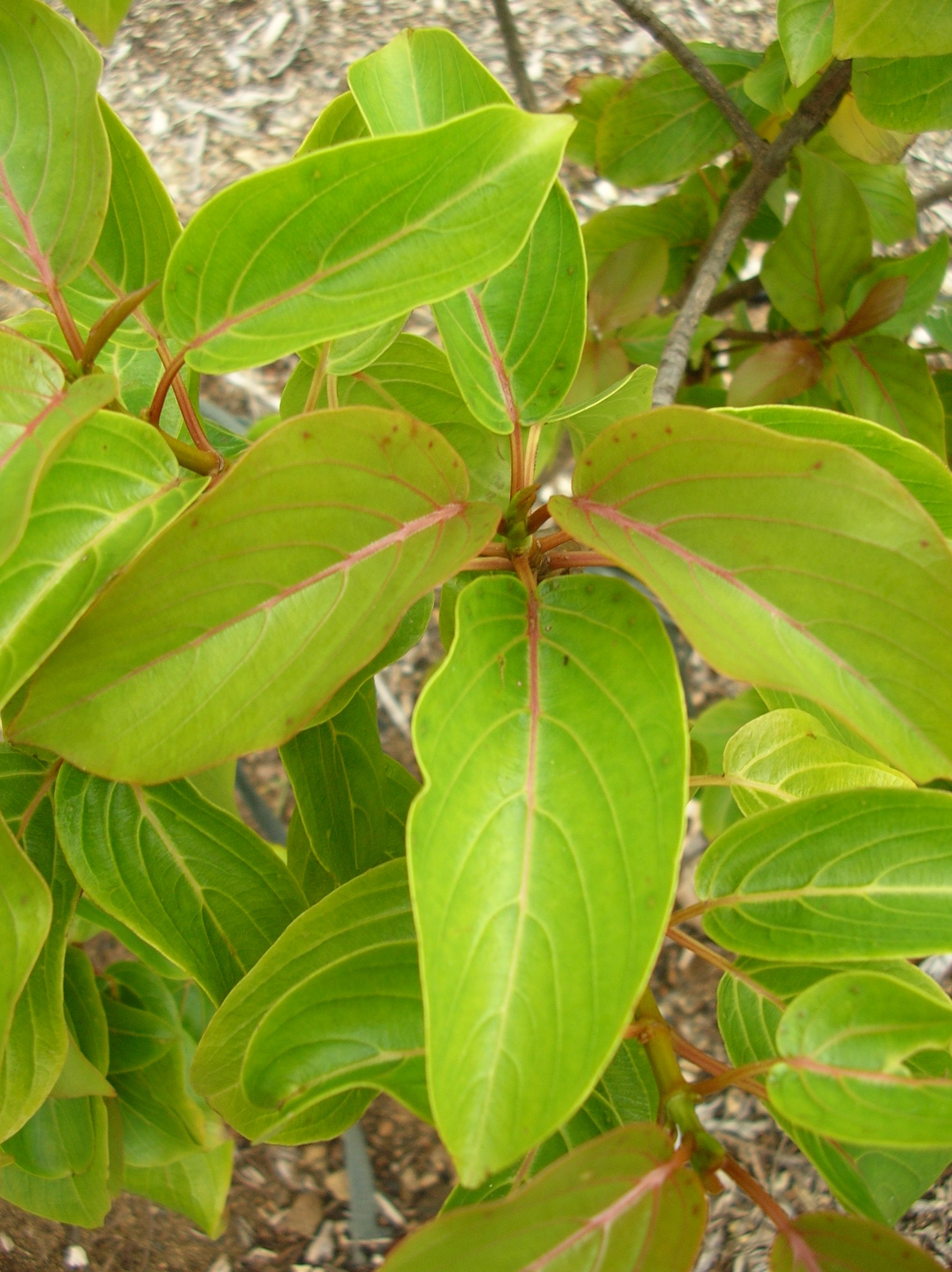

Conservation status
- Critically Endangered (IUCN 3.1)

- Critically Imperiled (NatureServe)

Scientific classification
- Kingdom: Plantae
- Clade: Tracheophytes
- Clade: Angiosperms
- Clade: Eudicots
- Clade: Rosids
- Order: Rosales
- Family: Rhamnaceae
- Genus: Colubrina
- Species: C. oppositifolia

Binomial name
- Colubrina oppositifolia Brongn. ex H.Mann

= Colubrina oppositifolia =

Species of tree

Colubrina oppositifolia, known as kauila in Hawaiian, is a rare species of flowering tree in the family Rhamnaceae endemic to Hawaii.

== Description ==
This tree reaches a height of 5–13 m (16–43 ft). The trunk is coated in shredding gray-brown bark and the smaller twigs are reddish. The leaves are oppositely arranged and have pointed oval blades. The yellow-green flowers occur in clusters of 10 to 12. The fruit is a rounded capsule which is explosively dehiscent.

== Distribution and habitat ==
It can be found in Hawaiian dry, coastal mesic, and mixed mesic forests at elevations of 240–920 m (790–3,020 ft) on the islands of Oʻahu (Waiʻanae Range) and Hawaiʻi (on the slopes of Kohala, Hualālai, and Mauna Loa). There is also one individual remaining on Maui. Associated plants include alaheʻe (Psydrax odorata) and ʻohe kukuluāeʻo (Reynoldsia sandwicensis).

== Uses ==
Native Hawaiians valued the hard wood of C. oppositifolia and that of a related species, Alphitonia ponderosa, both of which were known as kauila. Consequently, the exact usage of C. oppositifolia wood is unknown. It is believed to have been used in pou (house posts), hohoa (round kapa beaters), ʻiʻe kūkū (square kapa beaters), ʻō (harpoons), hiʻa kā ʻupena (fishing net shuttles), ihe paheʻe (javelins), pololū (spears), pāhoa (daggers), lāʻa pālau (clubs), leiomano (shark tooth clubs), ʻōʻō (digging sticks), pieces for ʻume (a wand game), and ʻūkēkē (musical bows).

== Conservation ==
This tree has become very rare in the wild. Once a dominant species of the forests it inhabits, it has now been reduced to no more than 300 wild individuals. Threats to the species have included introduced plant species, herbivory by feral pigs and goats, rats, and the black twig borer (Xylosandrus compactus), an invasive insect. The hard wood made it valuable to people, who overharvested it. This is a federally listed endangered species of the United States.

== See also ==
- Alphitonia ponderosa
- Kauila
