= Pacific Insects Monographs =

- Language: English

Publication details
- History: 1961–1986
- Publisher: Bishop Museum

Standard abbreviations
- ISO 4: Pac. Insects Monogr.

Indexing
- ISSN: 0078-7515

Links
- Journal homepage

Pacific Insects Monographs was a scientific journal published by the Entomology Department, Bishop Museum, from 1961 to 1986. Its articles are about insects in Asia. They have a major focus on the Pacific, especially including New Guinea but also often extend into studies on Indian and East Asian insects (like those in China and Japan). It has 42 volumes.
