= Leiomano =

Type of Polynesian club

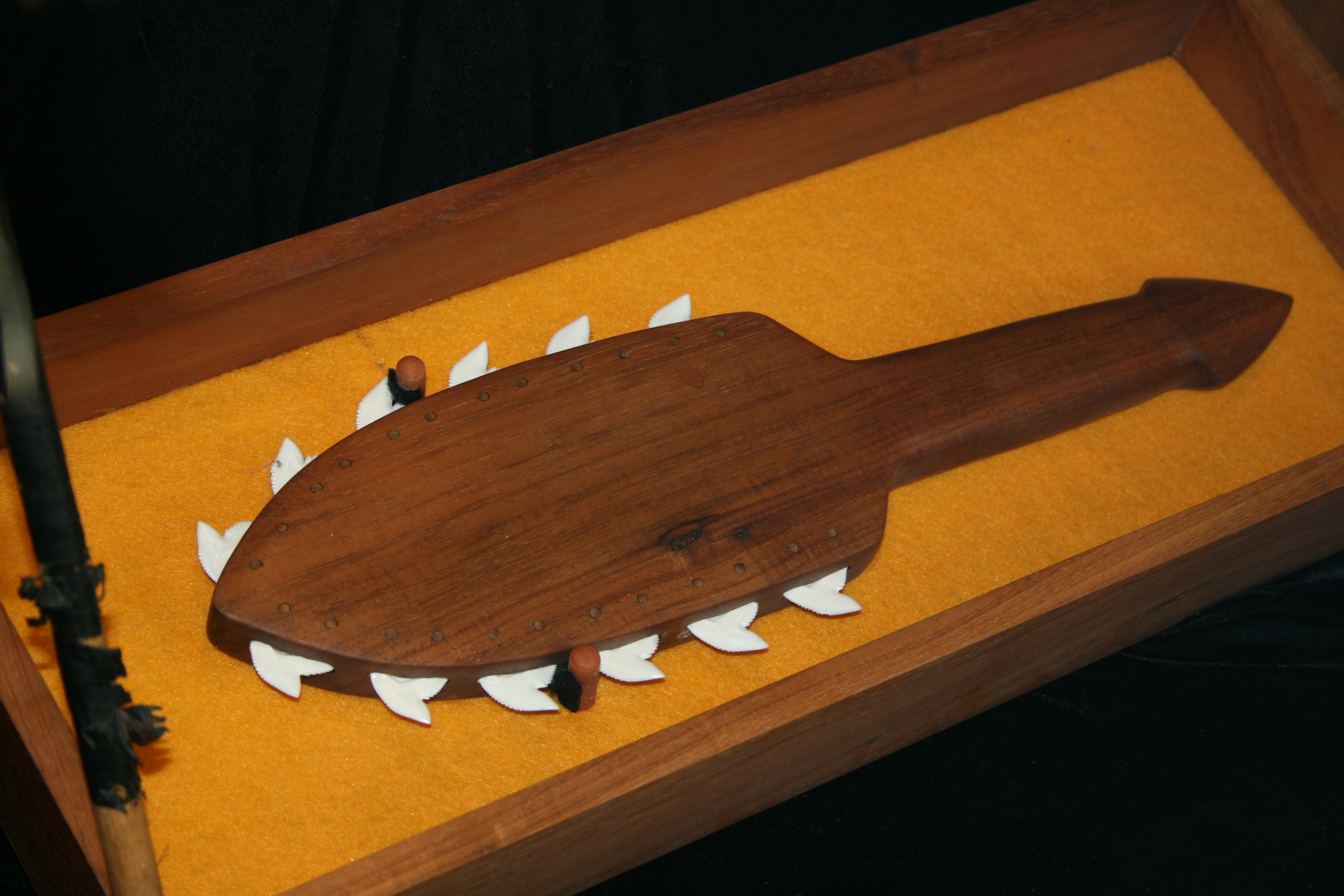
Leiomano made with tiger shark teeth

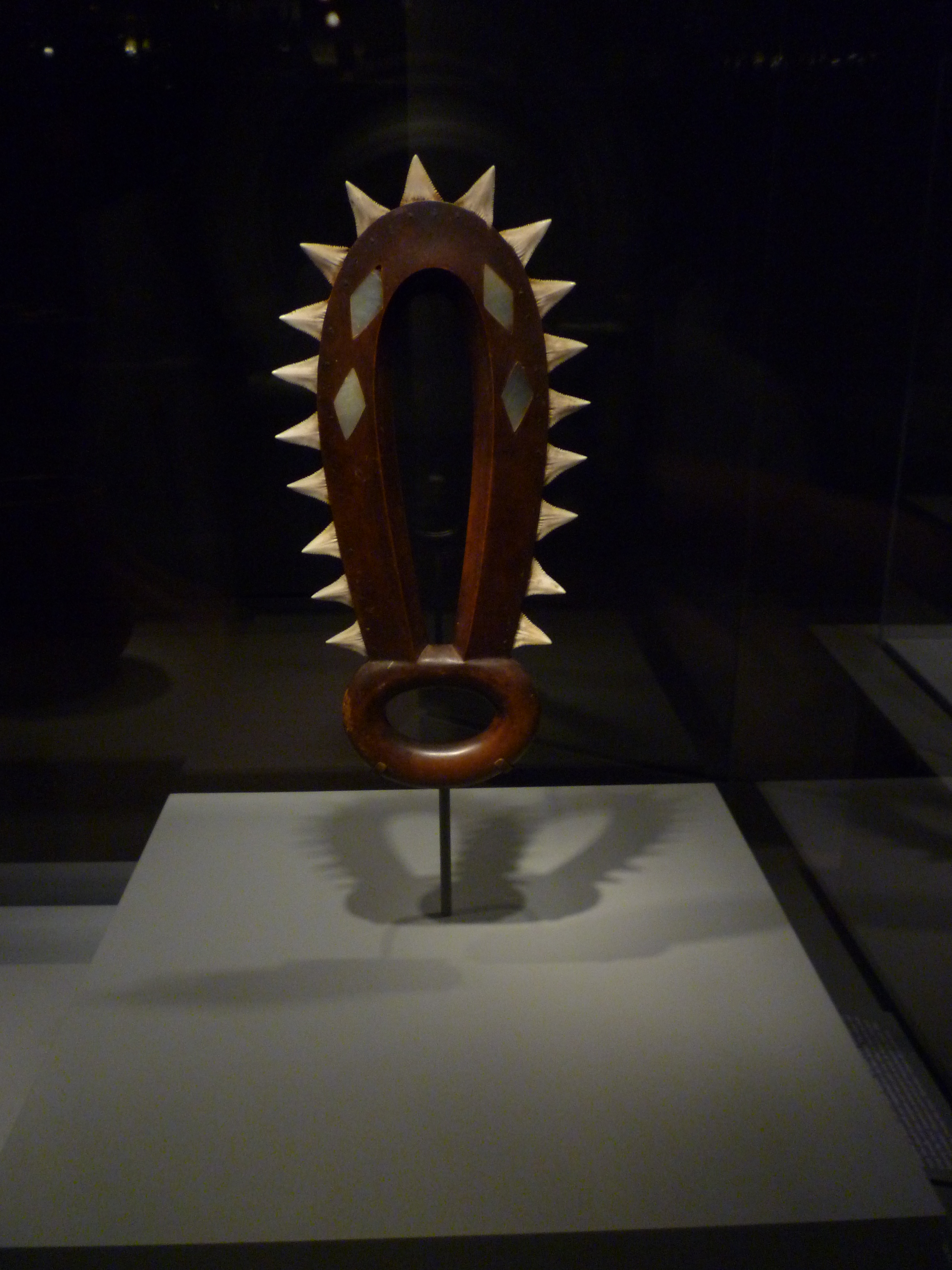
Early 19th-century Hawai'ian leiomano

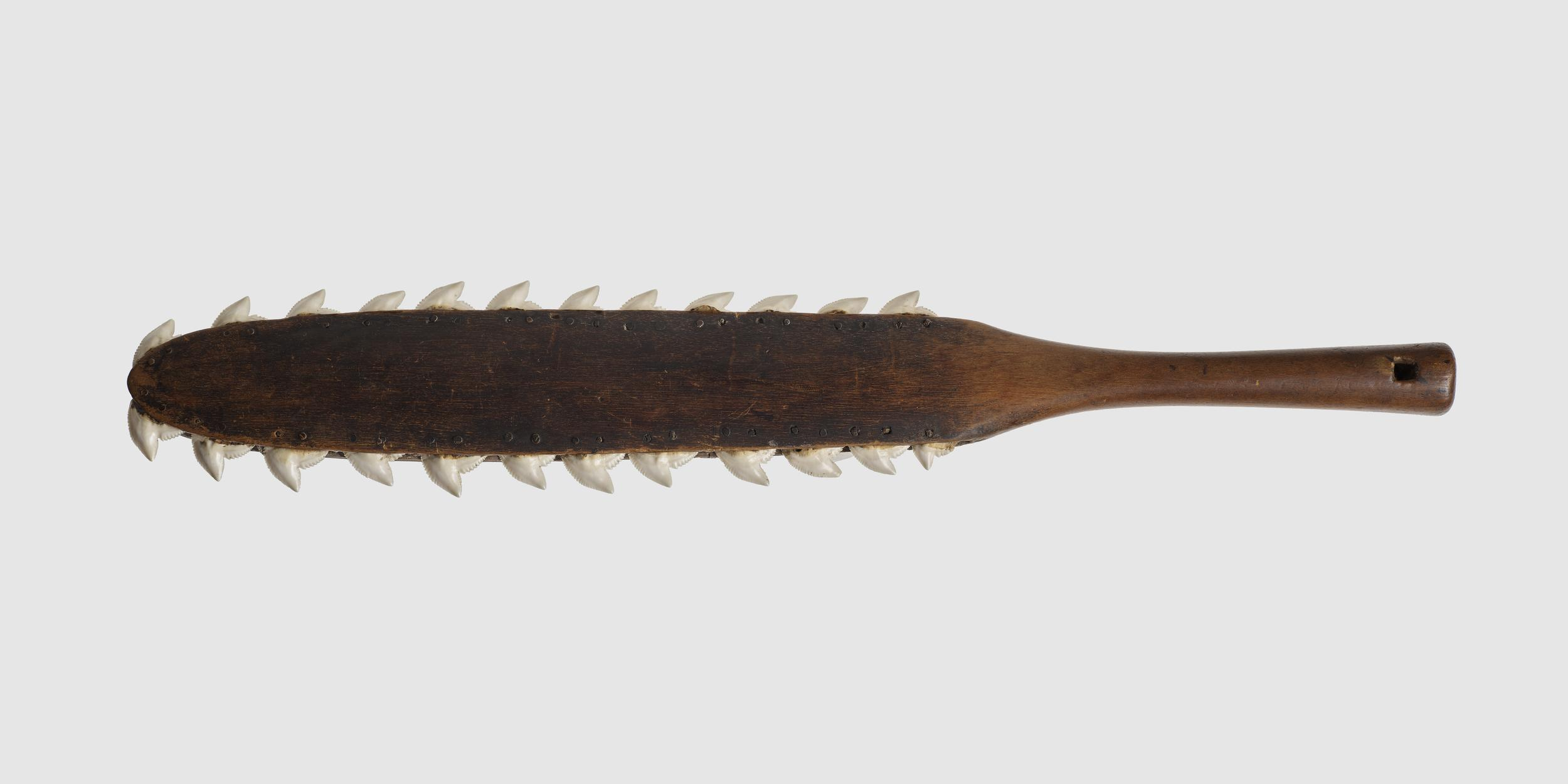
Leiomano at the British Museum

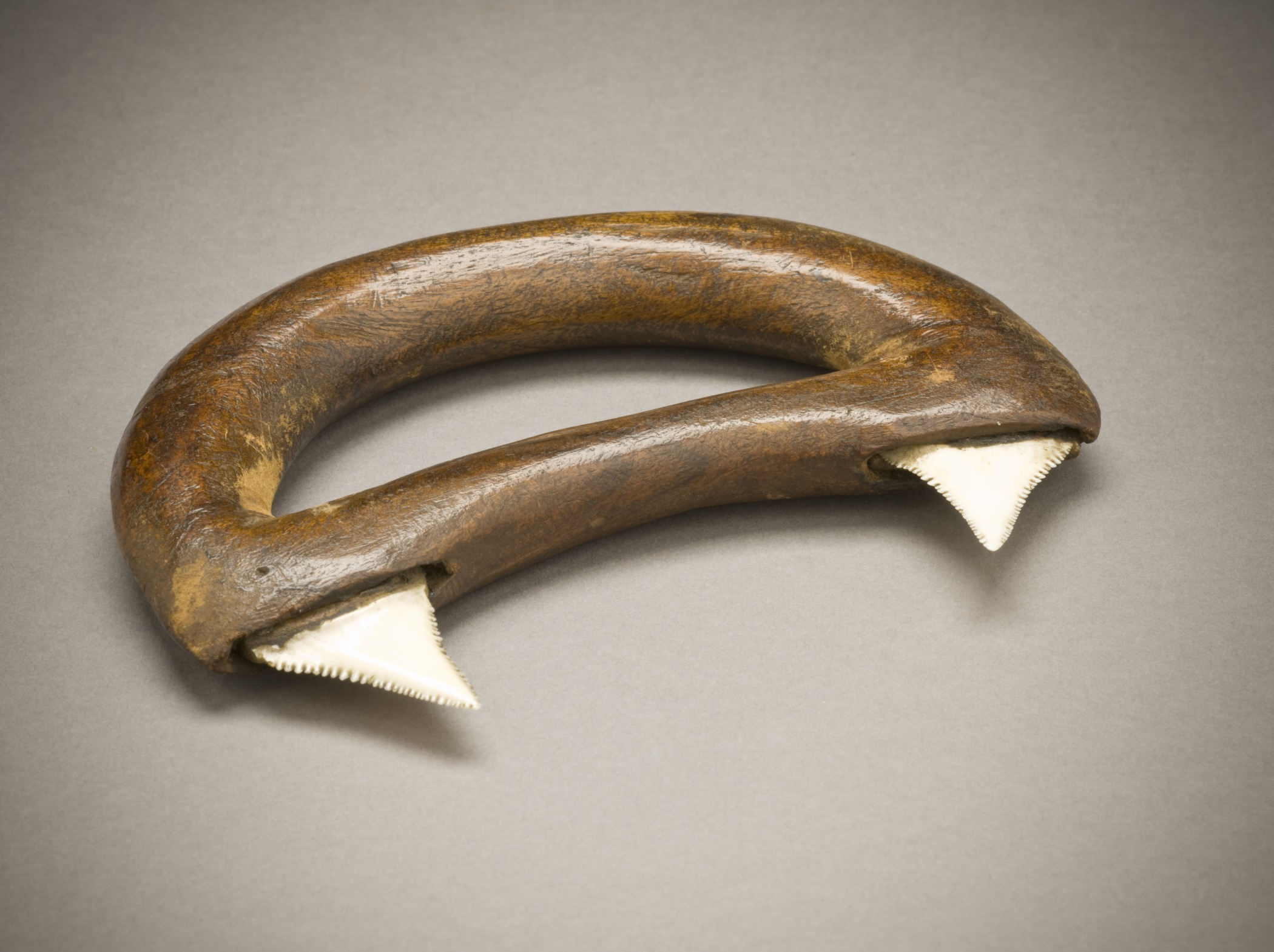
Leiomano knuckle duster at the Los Angeles County Museum of Art.

The leiomano is a shark-toothed club used by various Polynesian cultures, primarily by the Native Hawaiians.

The word "leiomano" is derived from the Hawaiian language and may originate from lei o manō, meaning "a shark's lei."

The weapon resembles a thick ping-pong paddle inset with shark teeth, typically from the tiger shark. These teeth are placed into grooves in the club and sewn into place. The tip of the handle may also utilize a marlin bill as a dagger. The weapon functions as a bladed club, similar to the obsidian-studded macuahuitl of the pre-Columbian Mesoamerican cultures.

== North America ==
A weapon of similar form was discovered in pieces at Cahokia, Illinois, in 1948 by Gregory Perino. Greatly damaged by a plow, the weapon was composed of eight chert imitation shark teeth, and tipped with five actual shark teeth. In both cases, the teeth were related to the great white.

== In popular culture ==
The character Roadhog from the 2016 video game Overwatch has two skins, named "Islander" and "Toa", that are inspired by traditional Polynesian culture. In these skins, his hook is changed to be made of bone with shark teeth threaded to its edges, resembling a leiomano.

== See also ==
- Macuahuitl
