= Mystery Stone =

Mystery Stone may refer to:

== United States ==
Listed alphabetically by state

- Bourne Stone in Bourne, Massachusetts
- Runestone of Nomans Land, Massachusetts
- Kensington Runestone of Kensington, Minnesota
- Lake Winnipesaukee mystery stone, reportedly found in 1872 in Meredith, New Hampshire
- Los Lunas Decalogue Stone of Los Lunas, New Mexico
- Heavener, Poteau, and Shawnee runestones of Oklahoma
- Grave Creek Stone of Moundsville, West Virginia

== Elsewhere ==
- Stone spheres of Costa Rica
- Ica stones of South America

== See also ==
- Bat Creek Stone, in Loudon County, Tennessee
- Dighton Rock, in Berkley, Massachusetts
- Newark Holy Stones, near Newark, Ohio
