= Grave Creek Stone =

Inscribed stone found at the Grave Creek Mound in West Virginia

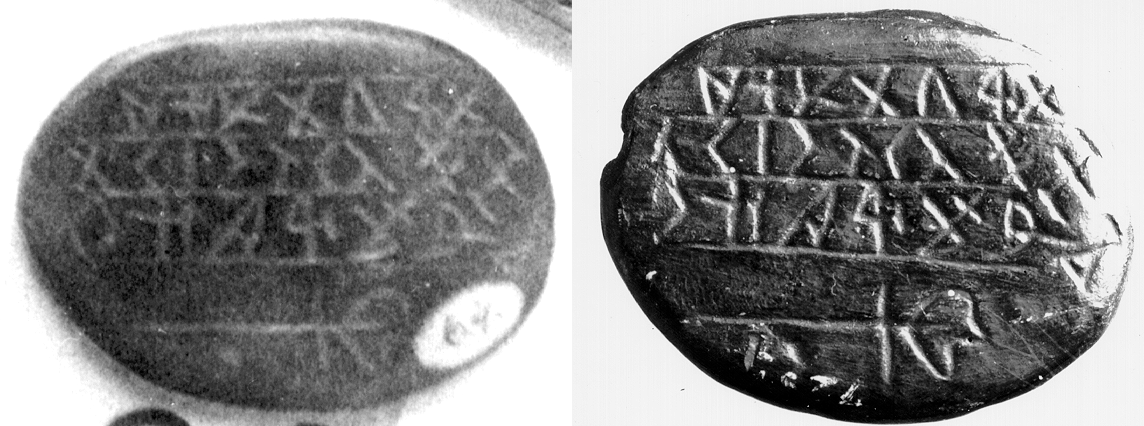
The Grave Creek Stone and a plaster cast of the stone in the collection of the Smithsonian Museum of Natural History.

The Grave Creek Stone is a small sandstone disk inscribed on one side with some twenty-five characters, purportedly discovered in 1838 at Grave Creek Mound in Moundsville, West Virginia. If genuine, it could provide evidence of Pre-Columbian writing, but the discovery that the characters can be found in a 1752 book suggests that it is probably a fraud. While replicas have been made, the original stone has been lost. The only known image of the actual stone is a photograph of items in the E.H. Davis collection (circa 1878) before the majority of the collection was sold to the Blackmore Museum (now part of the British Museum).

== Discovery ==
In 1838, an archaeological excavation of Grave Creek Mound, led by Jesse and Abelard Tomlinson, uncovered the ruins of two large vaults, one situated directly below the other. The vaults contained several human skeletons and a considerable amount of jewelry and other artifacts. According to Henry Rowe Schoolcraft, a renowned geologist who visited the site in 1843, the Grave Creek Stone was discovered in the upper vault, along with seventeen hundred beads, five hundred sea shells, five copper bracelets, and one hundred and fifty plates of mica. It was "a small flat stone, of an ovate shape, containing an inscription in unknown characters". Schoolcraft was the first to subject the stone to a critical examination. Five years after its discovery, he found it "lying unprotected among broken implements of stone, pieces of antique pottery, and other like articles", suggesting that those who found it had not recognised the potential significance of the artifact.

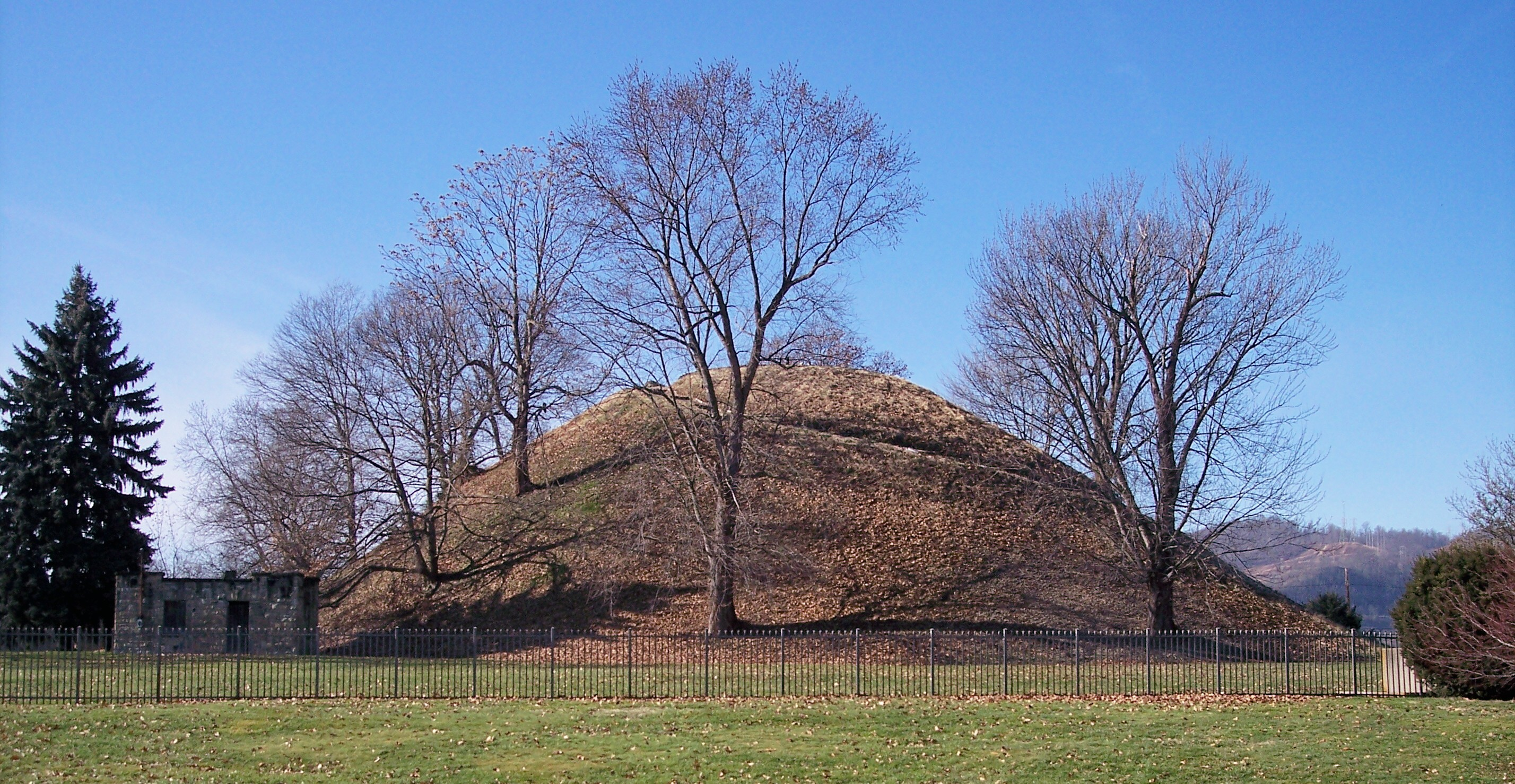
Grave Creek Mound

The precise details of the stone's discovery are disputed. The first published account of the find, along with a woodcut of the inscription, occupied the front page of the Cincinnati Chronicle of February 2, 1839, in an article written by Thomas Townsend. Another drawing of the stone, "differing essentially in its characters", was published in The American Pioneer in May 1843, accompanied by Abelard Tomlinson's eyewitness account of the stone's discovery. He says that the stone was discovered on June 9, 1838, about two feet from the skeleton in the upper vault. It had "no engraving on it, except for on one side". In a later statement, Tomlinson asserts that "I removed it with my own hands ... from its ancient bed". A letter dated April 10, 1839, written by James Clemens, who spent two weeks at the Grave Creek site collecting data in the summer of 1838, appears to corroborate Tomlinson's version of events. Clemens writes that "Abelard Tomlinson, Thomas Biggs, myself, and others were present when the stone was discovered with the copper bracelets and the shell necklace".

Peter Catlett, one of the workers involved in the excavation, offers a conflicting account: "I was the man who found the stone ... The engraved stone was found on the inside of a stone arch". His testimony was supported by Colonel Wharton, who claims to have spotted the stone amongst the loose dirt and debris being wheeled out of the mound that day. Stephen Williams, author of Fantastic Archaeology, considers Catlett's story to be the most credible, explaining that "Tomlinson's description of the way the shaft and drift were dug does not accord with any of the statements made by any of the observers of the excavations". The same view was expressed by M.C. Reid, in his 1878 report, published in The American Antiquarian. Reid also pointed out numerous factual errors in Tomlinson's statement, concluding that "it is very certain that Mr. Tomlinson is mistaken and that he did not find the inscribed stone".

== Artifact ==
The sandstone disk is about 1.875 inches (4.76 cm) wide, and 1.5 inches (3.8 cm) high. One side of the stone is inscribed with 23 alphabetical / pseudo-alphabetical characters arranged in three lines with a final non-alphabetical symbol on the lower portion. There are no inscriptions on the reverse side. The stone passed through various collections, but its current location is unknown. While it was in E.H. Davis's collection in the late 1800s, he made a cast of it which he deposited to the Smithsonian's National Museum of Natural History, Department of Anthropology. The Smithsonian now has four casts of the stone. The National Anthropological Association also has a wax impression of the stone made by Davis. Six facsimile drawings were also made of the stone.

== Inscription ==
The inscription on the Grave Creek Stone has been the object of much controversy. Henry Rowe Schoolcraft was the first to study this aspect of the stone. He strove to determine whether or not the symbols were alphabetical by consulting experts on the subject. His correspondence with "noted antiquarians" led him to the conclusion that inscription contains "four characters corresponding to the Ancient Greek; four Etruscan; five Runic; six ancient Gallic; seven old Erse; ten Phoenician; fourteen old British; sixteen Celtiberic, with some resemblance to the Hebrew". However, he was "inclined to regard the whole inscription as Celtiberic".

M.C. Reid performed an experiment in the late 1870s to demonstrate that the symbols were not necessarily alphabetic. He asked four people (a teacher and law student, a schoolgirl, a pharmacist, and a college professor) to create for him "twenty or more arbitrary characters not resembling any figures or alphabetical characters known to them". Since the Grave Creek Stone was inscribed using only straight lines (which is quite common, since straight lines are much easier to inscribe than those with curve), Reid instructed the four participants to only use "straight lines or combinations of straight lines". To further simulate the actual inscribing of the stone, the individuals were not allowed to improve upon their first attempt (since one cannot erase all or part of a symbol once it is inscribed). Just like the inscription on the Grave Creek Stone, these symbols were found to resemble characters found in alphabets of the old world. Reid was "compelled to conclude that there is nothing in the form of the characters of the Grave Creek Stone which require us to decide that they are old, that they are alphabetical, or if alphabetical that they are derived from any known alphabet".

== Recent research ==
At a meeting of the West Virginia Archaeological Society in October 2008, the anthropologist David Oestreicher suggested that the inscription had been forged by James W. Clemens, a local physician who had financed the excavation through loans. Oestreicher found the source of the inscription; an 18th-century volume, "An Essay on the Alphabets of the Unknown Letters That are Found in the Most Ancient Coins and Monuments of Spain". "Everything on the stone", including "impossible sequences of characters with the same mistakes", was copied directly from the volume.

== See also ==
- Bat Creek Inscription
- Los Lunas Decalogue Stone
- Newark Holy Stones
