= Ohio Hanukkiah Mound =

Mound in North America

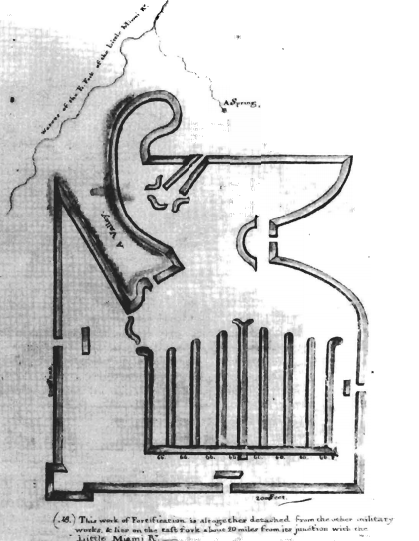
Map of Ohio Hanukkiah Mound

The Ohio Hanukkiah Mound was a mound believed to be in the shape of a menorah and oil lamp, located near the Little Miami River in Milford, Ohio. Its origins are typically attributed to the Hopewell culture.

== Discovery ==
In 1803, William Lytle II was a surveyor in Clermont County, Ohio, and first recorded the mound in one of his maps. The mound was further recorded in 1811, in Observations on the Climate in Different Parts of America by Hugh Williamson, and in 1834 by Maj. Isaac Roberdeau.

Ohio Hanukkiah Mound is located within East Fork State Park, Indian Mound Shelter & Picnic Area, Bethel OH. (GPS antipodes ... 39.012285 -84.133440 ... -39.012285 95.866560)

== Site description ==
The East Fork Earthwork is a Native American Earthwork and is attributed to the Middle woodland Hopewell culture, from about 100 BC to 500 AD. Its location is on the east fork of the Little Miami River in Clermont County, Ohio. The "Hanukkiah" mound has been described as having a 9-branched section resembling a menorah, surrounded by an oil lamp. Each branch was noted to have been 66 feet apart, and the base of the mound being 902 feet long. Some academics have identified the site as a bird effigy.

== See also ==
- Serpent Mound
- Bat Creek inscription
- List of Hopewell sites
