= Johnson Museum (disambiguation) =

The Herbert F. Johnson Museum of Art is at Cornell University, Ithaca, New York, US.

Johnson Museum may also refer to:

- President Andrew Johnson Museum and Library, Tusculum University, Greeneville, Tennessee, US
- Lyndon Baines Johnson Library and Museum, Austin, Texas, US
- Samuel Johnson Birthplace Museum, Lichfield, Staffordshire, UK
- Dr Johnson's House, London, UK

== See also ==
- Johnson-Humrickhouse Museum, Roscoe Village, Coshocton, Ohio, USA
- Johnson County Museum of History, Franklin, Indiana, USA
- Jonson Gallery, University of New Mexico, Albuquerque, New Mexico, USA
- Scots Musical Museum, a folk song collection by James Johnson
