= Cyrus H. Gordon =

American Near Eastern scholar (1908–2001)

- Born: Cyrus Herzl Gordon; June 29, 1908; Philadelphia, Pennsylvania, U.S.
- Died: March 30, 2001 (aged 92)
- Occupation: Scholar
- Father: Benjamin Gordon

Academic background
- Education: University of Pennsylvania (BA, MA, PhD)

Cyrus Herzl Gordon (June 29, 1908 – March 30, 2001) was an American scholar of Near Eastern cultures and ancient languages.

== Biography ==
Gordon was born in Philadelphia, Pennsylvania, the son of Lithuanian emigrant and physician Benjamin Gordon. He was raised in an upper class Jewish family with a particular emphasis on devotion to Jewish learning, rational thinking, as well as an openness to secular learning. As a scholar he followed an education track typical of elite European philological scholars: Gordon began studying Hebrew at age five and became interested in both Greek and Latin as a young child.

Gordon took his B.A., M.A., and Ph.D. at the University of Pennsylvania, and also took courses at both nearby Gratz College and Dropsie College. These three institutions had specialized programs in the Bible, classics, and ancient Near East, all of which contributed to Gordon's historical-philological bent. At these universities, Gordon studied Old Persian and Sanskrit as well.

As an American Schools of Oriental Research (ASOR) fellow, Gordon spent the first half of the 1930s in the Near East working out of both the Baghdad and Jerusalem centers. Gordon dug with Leonard Woolley at Ur, and worked with Flinders Petrie at Tell el-'Ajjul. He worked with W. F. Albright at Tell Beit Mirsim, and accompanied Nelson Glueck on his explorations in Transjordan. He was involved in the examination and translation of the Egyptian Amarna tablets while with the J.D.S. Pendlebury expedition.

Despite this impressive pedigree, when Gordon returned to the U.S. in 1935, he was unable to find a permanent academic position, primarily due to the Depression but also because of academic antisemitism. Therefore, he took a series of temporary positions at Johns Hopkins University (under Albright), at Smith College, and at the Institute for Advanced Study in Princeton, New Jersey.

== World War II ==
During World War II, Gordon served in the U.S. military, volunteering for the Army in 1942, at the age of 33. As the head of a new cryptanalysis team, Gordon and other linguists used their collective skills in deciphering and analyzing encrypted messages. The Nazis and the Japanese sent coded messages, not just in German and Japanese, but also in such languages as Arabic, Turkish, and Persian. Gordon later remarked that his cryptography work for the U.S. Army provided him with the tools he later used in his work with the Minoan script designated Minoan Linear A. Later in the war, Lieutenant Gordon was assigned to the Middle East, serving in the Mediterranean, Egypt, Palestine, Iraq, and eventually in Iran. There he learned to speak Modern Persian. He had various duties in Iran, including serving as interpreter or intermediary with local officials and rulers. He also found the time to engage in scholarship. He visited major archaeological sites of ancient Persia, and published a treatise on a number of Aramaic Incantation bowls from the collection of the Teheran Museum.

== Academic career ==
After the war, Gordon took a full tenured position at Philadelphia's Dropsie College in 1946. He taught at Dropsie through 1956, then at Brandeis for eighteen years. He came to New York University (NYU) in 1973, and served as director of the Center for Ebla Research, spearheading work on that ancient Syrian city. During his career, he taught classes and seminars and published work in a wide range of fields. These include: field archaeology, glyphic art, cuneiform law, the Amarna letters, the Bible, Hebrew language, Ugaritic, Aramaic magic bowls, Nuzi tablets, Minoan Linear A, Homer, Egyptology, Coptic, Hittite, Hurrian, Sumerian, and Classical Arabic. He retired from NYU in 1989.

Gordon is well known for his books on Ugaritic, the ancient language of 14th century (BC/BCE) coastal Syria, which were first published 1940 and he played a key role in deciphering that language. For teaching purposes, his three volume set, Ugaritic Textbook and the works of the Hungarian scholar, Joseph Aistleitner, were for a long time the only worthy works available. He asserted that Syrian literature reflects frequent contact between ancient Syrians and speakers of Hebrew in the eastern Mediterranean. Aside from Gordon's technical work as a philologist and Semiticist, particularly his work in Ugaritic (above), Gordon was one of the greatest synthesizers of biblical studies with the study of the ancient Near East, one of the final products of which was his 1997 tome, co-authored with Gary Rendsburg, The Bible and the Ancient Near East. This work constituted a follow-on to his earlier (1965) book, The Ancient Near East, which was itself a revision of The World of the Old Testament: An introduction to Old Testament Times (1953).

Gordon's autobiography, A Scholar's Odyssey, won a National Jewish Book Award in 2000. His work has been carried forward in part by his student and Rutgers University professor Gary A. Rendsburg.

In 1973, a Festschrift was published in his honor, called Orient and Occident. : Essays presented to Cyrus H. Gordon on the occasion of his sixty-fifth birthday.

== Nontraditional viewpoints ==
Not afraid of scholarly controversy, Gordon challenged traditional theories about Greek and Hebrew cultures. In the 1960s, he declared his examination of Cretan texts in the Minoan language corroborated his long-held theory that Greek and Hebrew cultures stemmed from a common Semitic heritage. He asserted that this culture spanned the eastern Mediterranean from Greece to Palestine during the Minoan era. Gordon's student, Michael Astour, published the most comprehensive treatment of this controversial thesis in his monumental Helleno-Semitica: An Ethnic and Cultural Study in West Semitic Impact on Mycenaean Greece (1965).

Gordon also held that Jews, Phoenicians, and others crossed the Atlantic in antiquity, ultimately arriving in both North and South America. This opinion was based on his own work, now rejected by archaeologists, on the Bat Creek inscription found in Tennessee and on the transcription of the debunked Paraíba inscription from Brazil, as well as his assessment of the Los Lunas Decalogue Stone.

Gordon was a friend of John Philip Cohane and wrote a preface to Cohane's book The Key; he was supportive of many of Cohane's theories. Additionally, Gordon collaborated with German-Mexican historian Alexander von Wuthenau, and wrote the foreword to his book Unexpected Faces in Ancient America.

Gordon's diffusionist claims have been criticized by traditional archaeologists.

== Published work ==
- Ugaritic Grammar, 1940, Rome: Pontificium Institutum Biblicum.
- The Living Past, 1941, John Day, New York: Van Rees Press.
- Ugaritic Literature, 1949, Pontificium Institutum Biblicum, Rome.
- Ugaritic Manual, 1955, Rome: Pontificium Institutum Biblicum.
- "Homer and Bible", 1955, Hebrew Union College Annual 26, pp. 43–108.
- The Common Background of Greek and Hebrew Civilizations, 1962/1965, New York: Norton Library. (previously published as Before the Bible, New York: Harper & Row).
- Ugarit and Minoan Crete, 1966, New York: W. W. Norton & Company.
- "The Accidental Invention of the Phonemic Alphabet", 1970, Journal of Near Eastern Studies Vol. 29 #3, pp. 193–197
- Before Columbus, 1971, New York: Crown.
- "Vergil and the Bible World," 1971, The Gratz College Anniversary Volume, Philadelphia: Gratz College.
- "Poetic Legends and Myths from Ugarit," 1977, Berytus #25, pp. 5–133.
- Forgotten Scripts, 1982, New York: Basic Books (revised and enlarged version, previously published 1968, now containing Gordon's work on Minoan and Eteocretan).
- "The Bible and the Ancient Near East", 1997, New York: W. W. Norton & Company.

A comprehensive bibliography of Prof. Cyrus H. Gordon can be found in The Bible World: Essays in Honor of Cyrus H. Gordon, edited by G. Rendsburg, R. Adler, Milton Arfa, and N. H. Winter, 1980, KTAV Publishing House Inc. and The Institute of Hebrew Culture and Education of New York University, New York.

== See also ==
- Biblical archaeology
- Umberto Cassuto, scholar of Ugaritic texts and Hebrew Bible
- Joshua Berman
- Yehezkel Kaufman

== Bibliography ==
- Astour, Michael (1965). Helleno-Semitica: An Ethnic and Cultural Study in West Semitic Impact on Mycenaean Greece.
- Cross, F. (1968). "The Phoenician Inscription from Brazil, A Nineteenth- Century Forgery". Orientalia 37, pp. 437–60.
- Fisher, Eugene J. and McKusick, Marshall (1980). "East and West". The Biblical Archaeologist, Vol. 43, No. 2, (Spring, 1980), pp. 71–73.
- Gordon, Cyrus H. (2000). A Scholar's Odyssey (Biblical Scholarship in North America). Society of Biblical Literature. ISBN 0-88414-016-4.
- Gordon, Cyrus, H. (1965). The Ancient Near East. New York: Norton. ISBN 0-393-00275-6.
- Gordon, Cyrus H. (1965). Ugaritic Textbook. Analecta Orientalia 38: Rome: Pontificium Institutum Biblicum.
- McKusick, Marshall (1979). "Canaanites in America: A New Scripture in Stone?". The Biblical Archaeologist, Vol. 42, No. 3 (Summer 1979), pp. 137–140.
