= Alexander von Wuthenau =

German-Mexican architect, diplomat and archaeologist

Baron Alexander von Wuthenau-Hohenthurm (8 January 1900 – 10 January 1994), also known as Alejandro, was a German-Mexican architect, diplomat, art historian and archaeologist.

He wrote several books on trans-cultural diffusion and the ethnic composition of pre-Columbian America, chiefly of Mesoamerica. Based on analysis of archaeological pieces, both his own and others, von Wuthenau argued that the continent, contrary to mainstream theories, was ethnically heterogeneous and populated by people of Amerindian, black, white, Middle Eastern, East Asian, and mixed-race appearance, and thus had been thoroughly contacted by outside groups prior to European colonization in the 15th century. These ideas were opposed by many Mexican academics and have been described as lacking evidence.

== Biography ==
Von Wuthenau was born in Dresden, Germany in 1900 to a German noble family, the third son of military general Count Karl von Wuthenau-Hohenthurm and Countess Maria Antonia Chotek von Chotkow und Wognin, the sister of Sophie, Duchess of Hohenberg. A trained lawyer, von Wuthenau held diplomatic positions in the US and Argentina, first as secretary of the German delegation in Buenos Aires, Argentina beginning in 1928, and then as secretary of cultural affairs for the German embassy in Washington, DC in 1930. Also having a background in art history and sculpture, he resigned from his embassy position in 1934 shortly after Hitler's rise to power and accepted a commission to restore the altar of St. Francis Cathedral in Santa Fe, New Mexico, and later the El Carmen convent in San Ángel, Mexico City, and Museum of Religious Art in Taxco, Mexico, also known as Casa Humboldt, beginning in 1935, at which point he settled in Mexico permanently, residing for a time in Taxco, then Mexico City, and in his later years, Tepoztlan. Upon moving to Mexico, von Wuthenau began studying and collecting pre-Columbian sculpture and amassed a large collection of artifacts from the period, mostly terracotta and stone figurines and heads. He served as a professor of art history at Universidad de las Americas Puebla in San Andrés Cholula, Mexico and as a guest lecturer at other universities.

Beyond research and collecting, von Wuthenau worked as an architect in his midlife and later years, designing and building a number of homes in Mexico City and surrounding towns, including Tepoztlan. He also led an effort to rehabilitate the Atongo River in Tepoztlan through the dredging of garbage and construction of several small dams. A monument was constructed at La Canasta Park in Tepoztlan in his honor. He died in 1994 in Tepoztlan.

== Works ==
Von Wuthenau authored seven books, most notably Unexpected Faces in Ancient America (1975) and Pre-Columbian Terracottas (1970). The works display a wide variety of ethnic phenotypes in pre-Columbian archaeology, including black or African, Semitic, Japanese or East Asian, Celtic, and mixed-race types, and advance several theories on cultural diffusion in the region prior to European contact. Among these theories is that a voyage of Phoenicians or Hebrews from the Levant reached Mexico in approximately 100 BC, a view supported by Cyrus Gordon, Barry Fell, and Ivan van Sertima Von Wuthenau's theories on the ethnic foundations of Mexico were resisted by many in Mexico's academic community. In an article in the journal Ethnohistory, the authors wrote that "von Wuthenau presents no concrete evidence regarding the actual mechanism by which West African "negroids" could have come to the Americas beyond the credulous acceptance of any and all diffusionist theories from the Mormon's "ten lost tribes of Israel," to Thor Heyerdahl's papyrus raft and Charles Hapgood's ice age civilization."

The majority of von Wuthenau's personal archaeology collection, approximately 1,500 pieces, has been exhibited since 2018 at the Juan Beckmann Gallardo Cultural Center in Tequila, Mexico, under the auspices of the Instituto Nacional de Antropología e Historia (INAH), to which the pieces were donated in 2007.

== Family ==
Von Wuthenau married Rachelle di Catinelli von Obradich-Bevilacqua (1900-1945), an art history professor at Maryville College and children's book author, in St. Louis, Missouri in 1935. They moved to Mexico soon thereafter and had four children. In 1948 he married Beatrix Pietsch von Sidonienburg, with whom he had three children.

== Bibliography ==
- Tepoztlan: Arte y Color en México. 1958.
- Pre-Columbian Terracottas. 1970.
- Altamerikanische Tonplastik: Das Menschenbild der Neuen Welt. 1970.
- Unexpected Faces in Ancient America: The Testimony of Pre-Columbian Artists. 1975.
- The Art of Terracotta Pottery in Pre-Columbian Central and South America. 1975.
- México: Crisol de las Razas del Mundo. 1991.
- 5000 Años de Historia. 1995.

== Collection ==
Examples from von Wuthenau's personal collection, approximately 1,500 pieces and now in the custody of INAH, showing a variety of ethnic phenotypes:

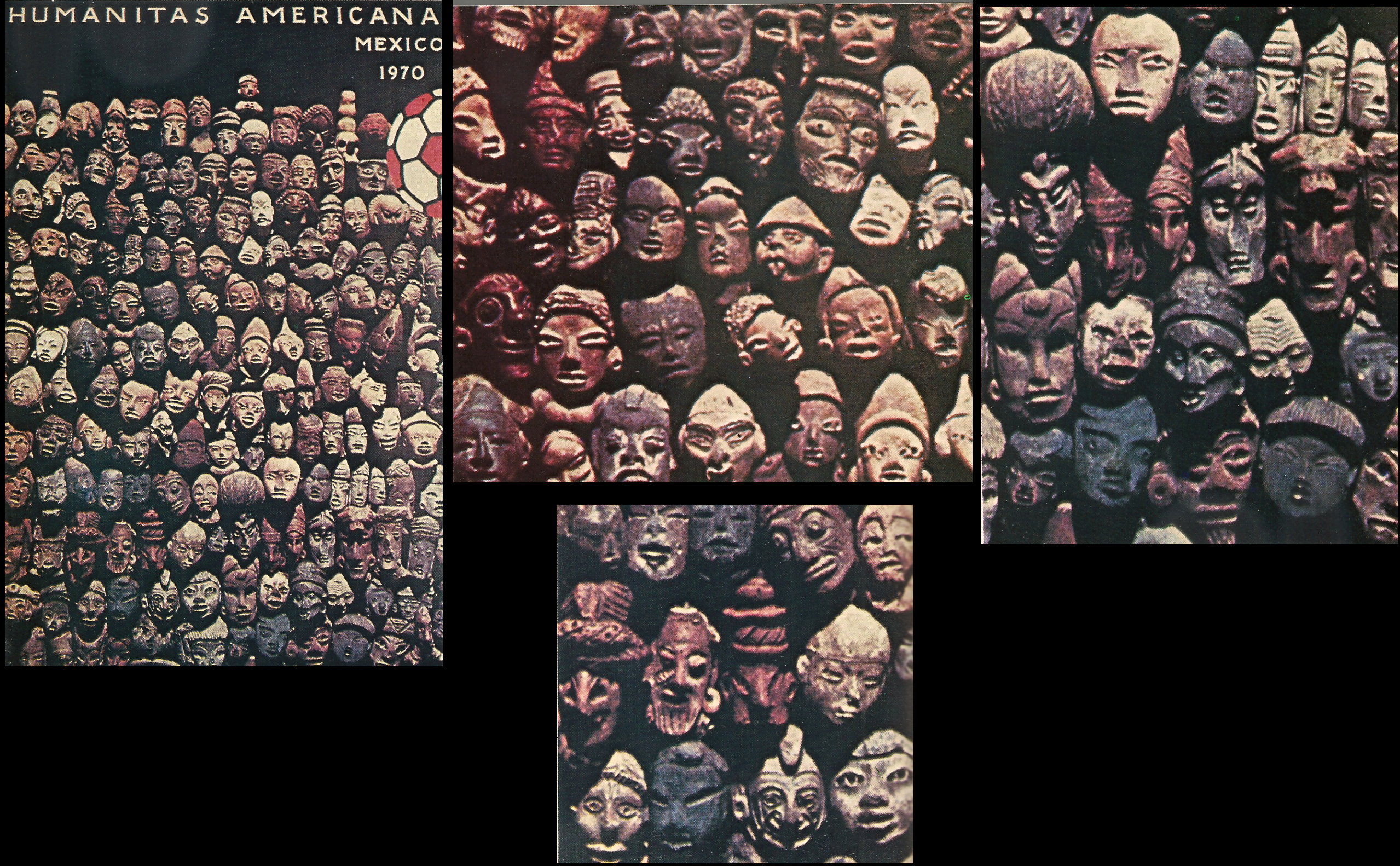

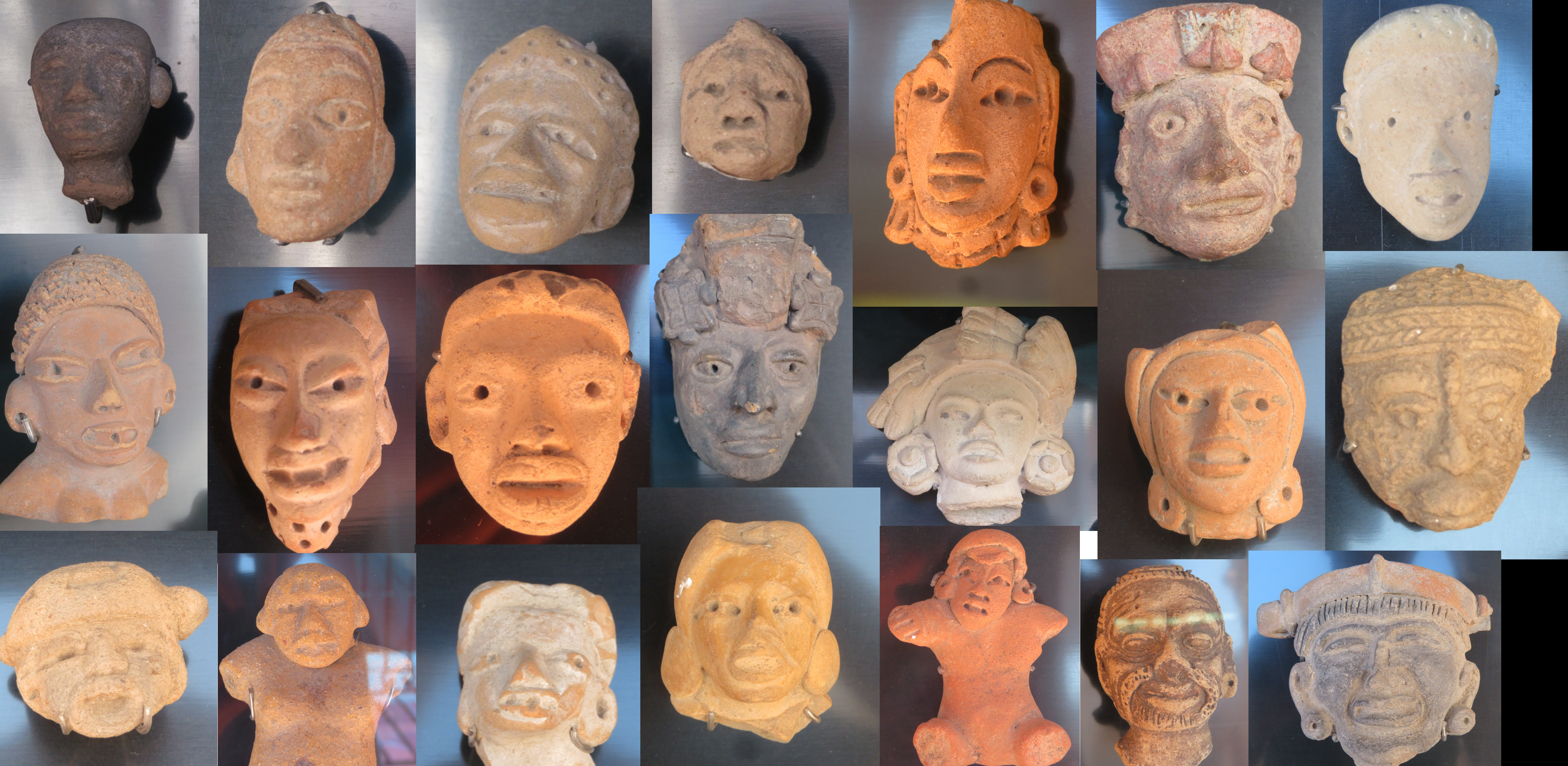
