= Los Lunas Decalogue Stone =

Inscribed boulder in New Mexico

Coordinates: 34.785217°N 106.996512°W

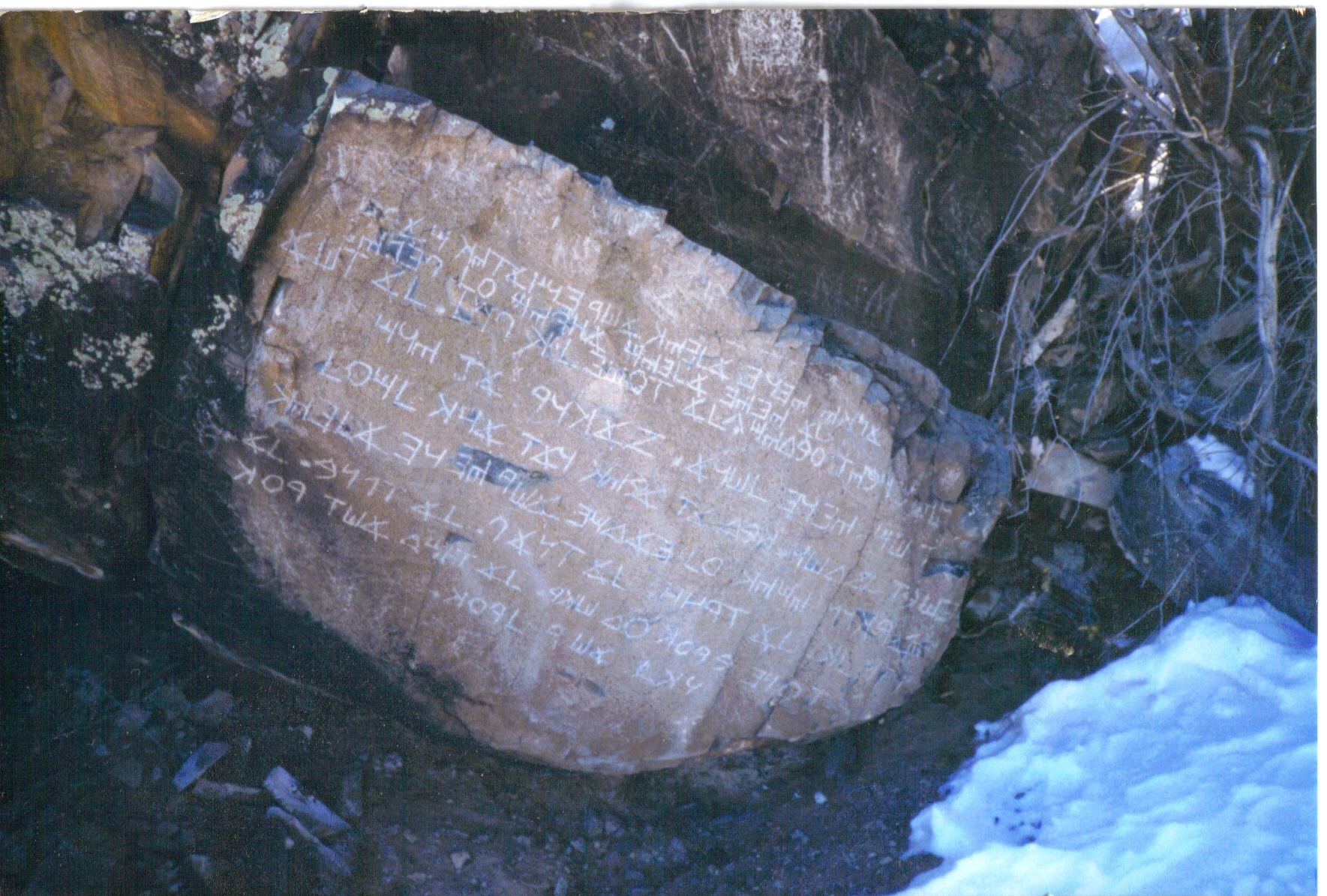
Los Lunas Decalogue Stone in situ in 1997

The Los Lunas Decalogue Stone is a hoax associated with a large boulder on the side of Hidden Mountain, near Los Lunas, New Mexico, about 35 miles (56 km) south of Albuquerque, that bears a nine-line inscription carved into a flat panel. The stone is also known as the Los Lunas Mystery Stone or Commandment Rock. The stone has gained notoriety in that some claim the inscription is Pre-Columbian, and therefore proof of early Semitic contact with the Americas. Standard archeological evidence contradicts this, however.

== History ==
The first recorded mention of the stone is in 1933, when professor Frank Hibben (1910–2002), an archaeologist from the University of New Mexico, saw it. According to a 1996 interview, Hibben was "convinced the inscription is ancient and thus authentic. He report[ed] that he first saw the text in 1933. At the time it was covered with lichen and patination and was hardly visible. He claimed he was taken to the site by a guide who claimed he had seen it as a boy, back in the 1880s." However, Hibben's testimony is tainted by charges that in at least two separate incidents, he fabricated some or all of his archaeological data to support his pre-Clovis migration theory.

The reported 1880s date of discovery is important to those who believe that the stone is pre-Columbian. However, the Paleo-Hebrew script, which is closely related to the Phoenician script, was known to scholars by at least 1870 - thus not precluding the possibility of a modern hoax.

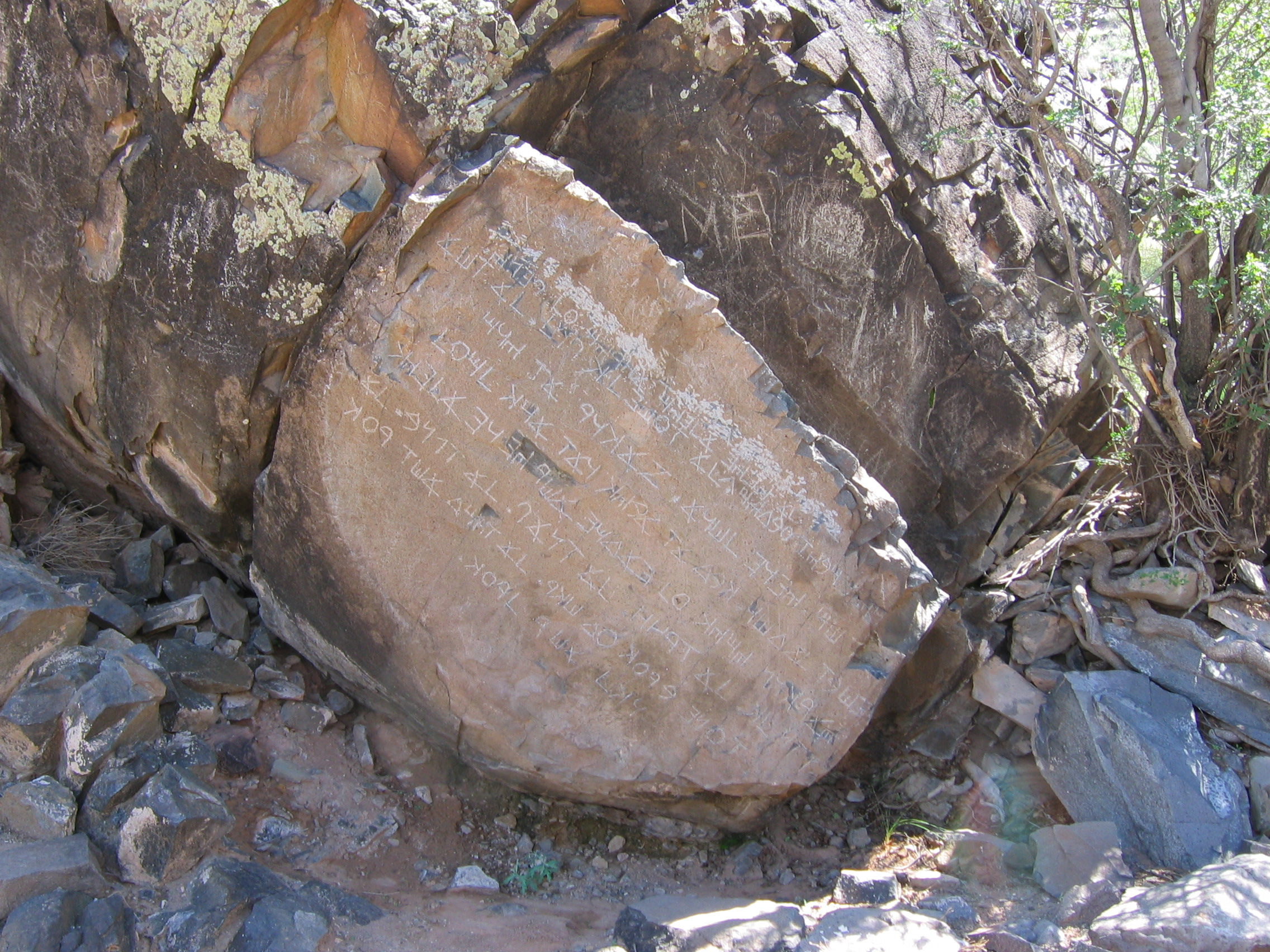
Los Lunas Decalogue Stone after 2006 vandalization of first line

Because of the stone's weight of over 80 tons, it was never moved to a museum or laboratory for study and safekeeping. Many visitors have cleaned the stone inscriptions over the years, likely destroying any possibility for scientific analysis of the inscriptions' patina. Nevertheless, comparing it to a modern inscription nearby, geologist George E. Morehouse, a colleague of Barry Fell, estimated that the inscription could be between 500 and 2000 years old and explaining its freshness and lack of patina as being due to frequent scrubbing to make it more visible.

In April 2006, the first line of the unprotected inscription was obliterated by vandals.

Visitors to the site are required to purchase a $35 Recreational Access Permit from the New Mexico State Land Office.

== Controversy ==
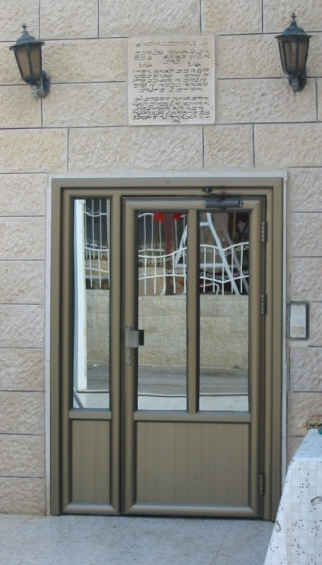
Modern Samaritan mezuzah over doorway. Kiryat Luza, Mount Gerizim.

Archaeolinguist Cyrus Gordon has proposed that the Los Lunas Decalogue is a Samaritan mezuzah. The familiar Jewish mezuzah is a tiny scroll placed in a small container mounted by the entrance to a house. The ancient Samaritan mezuzah, on the other hand, was commonly a large stone slab placed by the gateway to a property or synagogue, and bearing an abridged version of the Decalogue. On historical and epigraphic grounds, Gordon regards the Byzantine period as the most likely for the inscription. The Samaritan alphabet is a direct descendant of the Paleo-Hebrew alphabet.

One argument against the stone's antiquity is its apparent use of modern Hebrew (or otherwise atypical) punctuation, though amateur epigrapher Barry Fell argued that the punctuation is consistent with antiquity. Other researchers dismiss the inscription based on the numerous stylistic and grammatical errors that appear in the inscription.

According to archaeologist Kenneth Feder, "the stone is almost certainly a fake." He points out that "the flat face of the stone shows a very sharp, crisp inscription..." His main concern however is the lack of any archaeological context. He argues that to get to the location of the stone would have required whoever inscribed it to have "stopped along the way, encamped, eaten food, broken things, disposed of trash, performed rituals, and so on. And those actions should have left a trail of physical archaeological evidence across the greater American Southwest, discovery of which would undeniably prove the existence of foreigners in New Mexico in antiquity with a demonstrably ancient Hebrew material culture..." and states that "There are no pre-Columbian ancient Hebrew settlements, no sites containing the everyday detritus of a band of ancient Hebrews, nothing that even a cursory knowledge of how the archaeological record forms would demand there would be. From an archaeological standpoint, that's plainly impossible."

British archaeologist Keith Fitzpatrick-Matthews has concluded that "Viewed dispassionately, the Los Lunas inscription is a clear, but well constructed forgery (for its day). Despite the claims of high antiquity, there are features of the text (such as the mixing of letter forms between two separate alphabets) that are much more likely to derive from the work of a modern forger than from an ancient Hebrew or Samaritan scribe." Other speculative origin myths include the idea that members of a passing U.S. Army battalion made up primarily of Mormon soldiers during the Mexican-American War carved the stone.

== Similar landmarks ==
The Los Lunas Decalogue Stone is often grouped with the Heavener Runestone, Kensington Runestone, Dighton Rock, and the Newport Tower as examples of American landmarks with disputed provenances. Other disputed American Hebrew inscriptions include the Smithsonian Institution's Bat Creek Inscription and the Newark Ohio Decalogue Stone, Keystone, and Johnson-Bradner Stone.

== See also ==
- Bat Creek Inscription
- Diffusionism
- Newark Holy Stones
- Pseudoarchaeology
