= Johnson-Humrickhouse Museum =

Coordinates: 40°16′40″N 81°52′36″W

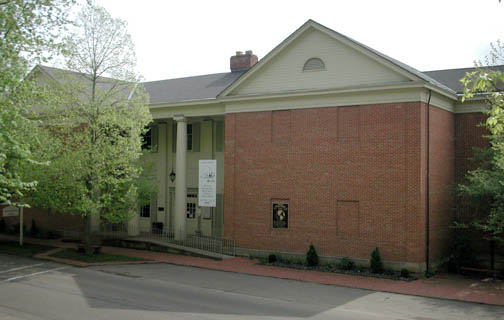
The Johnson-Humrickhouse Museum in Historic Roscoe Village.

The Johnson-Humrickhouse Museum is a general interest museum within historic Roscoe Village, a restored Ohio & Erie Canal town in Coshocton, OH. It has four permanent themed exhibits within five galleries, including a Native American Gallery, Historic Ohio, Asian (Japanese and Chinese), and 19th and 20th Century Decorative Arts. There are more than 17,000 items in its collections.

== History ==
The museum is the legacy of John and David Johnson, two brothers who grew up in Coshocton in the mid 19th century and traveled the world collecting regional and cultural artifacts from the places they visited. They bequeathed their personal collections of over 15,000 objects, to their home town with the request that a museum be formed in honor of their parents, Joseph Johnson and Mary Susan Humrickhouse. The Johnson-Humrickhouse Museum opened to the public on May 8, 1931. The brother's original collections included American Indian basketry and bead work, pre-Columbian clay figurines from Mexico, Japanese ceramics, woodblock prints and Samurai swords, Chinese lacquer ware, textiles, ceramics and wood carvings, and American and European ceramics, glassware, and textiles. JHM's collections have grown from private donations, primarily in areas of local history and pre-historic Ohio Indian tools and points.

== Permanent Exhibits ==
I. Native American Gallery

JHM's Native American gallery includes a wealth of stone tools and points from Ohio's earliest pre-historic peoples through the Adena and Hopewell periods. Of notable interest is the Rothenstein Cache, a collection of 342 blades found in 1963 when a plumber discovered a cache of prehistoric points while laying pipe for a house in Coshocton. The find consisted of 330 points packed side by side on their edges with twelve lying flat on top. The unfinished blades, composed of Coshocton black flint, ranged in length from 2.5 to 8.5 inches. They date back to the Adena culture, about 2,000 years old.

The gallery displays pottery, bead and quill work, carvings, and garments from various regions and tribes during the 18th, 19th, and 20th centuries.

II. Historic Ohio

This gallery includes a mock-up of a typical pioneer cabin and features the various tools, furnishings, and longrifles from Ohio's settlers of the late 18th through 19th centuries. The center piece of this gallery is a showcase of various 18th century longrifles, including smooth bore flintlocks, and 19th century rifles, muzzle loaders, percussion cap, and breech loading rifles.

Coshocton is also the birthplace of advertising art. In 1886, newspaper owner Jasper Meek used his printing press to advertise a shoe store on the surface of burlap school bags. After Meek established the first advertising art company, many start-ups followed. Most of the advertising was printed on metal trays and signs. Coca-Cola trays are the most common. It is believed that during the first decade of the 20th century, Coshocton had more artists in residence than any other city except New York City. Visitors can view Jasper Meek's 1830 model Washington Press and many examples of Coshocton advertising art.

III. Golden Gallery – The Golden Gallery features a Victiorian nook with 18 & 19th Century European & American furniture, textiles and decorative arts. Half of the gallery space is devoted to temporary displays.

IV. Asian: Chinese & Japanese 18 & 19th Century Arts & Weaponry. Japanese and Chinese artifacts, including Jade, porcelain, cloisonne, embroidery, lacquer ware, theater masks, intricate ivory and wood carvings, samurai armor, and samurai swords.

V. Special Exhibit - Gallery display five changing exhibits each year, and they vary from contemporary quilts, fine art and craft to World War II posters and traveling exhibits.

== Newark Holy Stones ==
The Decalogue Stone, one of four objects that make up the Newark Holy Stones.

The JHM houses the original and controversial Newark Holy Stones, composed of four objects: the Keystone, the Decalogue Stone, a two-piece box made to house the Decalogue Stone, and a bowl. Both the Keystone and Decalogue Stone are inscribed in Hebrew, and the Decalogue Stone also bears an image of Moses. Uncovered in the Newark earthworks in the 1860s, the ostensible context suggested a link with the Hopewell Indian culture, which thrived between 100 BC and 500 AD. The stones are accepted to be 19th-century forgeries, though their exact origin is uncertain.

== Notes of Interests ==
The Historic Ohio Gallery displays 19th and early 20th century tools, firearms and furnishings, most of which were donated to the museum in 1946 by a local family. Their descendants were Nicholas Miller and Mary Darling, Ohio pioneers. Nicholas came to what is now Coshocton County in 1802 with $36 and two axes. During his first winter he slept in a cave with his dog, which subsequently was killed by a bear. Nicholas used the money he earned surveying the land to purchase property. Meanwhile, the Darling family migrated from Virginia to the area in 1806. Eighteen-year-old Mary drove the four-horse team that pulled the covered wagon. She had eleven brothers and sisters who also made the journey. Nicholas and Mary married and their great-grandchildren were the donors. The museum displays the tar bucket that the Darlings used to grease their wagon wheels. A cave has also been constructed for children to climb into in memory of Nicholas and his dog.
