= Newark Holy Stones =

Archaeological forgery

The Newark Holy Stones refer to a set of artifacts allegedly discovered by David Wyrick in 1860 within a cluster of ancient Indian burial mounds near Newark, Ohio, now believed to be a hoax. The set consists of the Keystone, a stone bowl, and the Decalogue with its sandstone box. They can be viewed at the Johnson-Humrickhouse Museum in Coshocton, Ohio. The site where the objects were found is known as the Newark Earthworks, one of the biggest collections from an ancient American Indian culture known as the Hopewell that existed from approximately 100 BC to AD 500.

The Johnson-Humrickhouse Museum originally presented these artifacts neutrally, but has reorganised its exhibit changing the way it interprets them after the Center for the Future of Museums wrote in a report that "'Trust, Truth, and Fake News' as among the most important issues facing museums in the coming years" and David Fleming director of the National Museums Liverpool wrote that "no museum is actually 'neutral,' ever." The museum's director and a former collection manager for the museum stated that it would be wrong to "be neutral with regard to the Holy Stones because what we say and even what we do not say has social and political consequences" and that "The Holy Stones are a prism through which we can gain a clearer view of Ohio in 1860 CE, not 100 CE. Yet they also shed a bright light on ongoing efforts to rob American Indians of their rightful heritage and the modern legacy of the nineteenth-century science that sought to deny African Americans their most basic human rights." The display now allows visitors to see the exhibits from all four sides, includes an iPad kiosk with close-up photos, Google Earth geolocations, and "basic facts surrounding the discovery of the stones, and their connection to the other exhibitions in the same gallery, which covers socio-economic changes in the United States, specifically in Ohio, during the late nineteenth century."

== Discovery ==
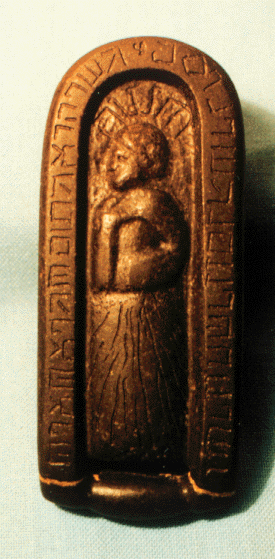
The Decalogue

The first of these artifacts, popularly known as the Keystone due to its shape, was excavated in June 1860. Unlike other ancient artifacts found previously in this region, the Keystone was inscribed with Hebrew. It contains one phrase on each side:

- Holy of Holies
- King of the Earth
- The Law of God
- The Word of God

The second find came later in November 1860 when Wyrick and his excavation team came across a sandstone box that contained a small, black rock within it. The black rock was identified as limestone by geologists Dave Hawkins and Ken Bork of Denison University. On this stone was carved Hebrew text that was translated as a condensed version of the Ten Commandments. The name Decalogue Stone comes from the translation of the Hebrew letters that outline the religious and moral codes described in Exodus 20:2-17 and Deuteronomy 5:6-21, which refer to the Decalogue or Ten Commandments. The inscription begins on the front at the top of an arch above the figure of a bearded man who is wearing a turban and robe, and appears to be holding a tablet. It runs down the left side, continues around all sides, and makes its way back to the front up the right side to where it began. This pattern indicates that the inscription was meant to be read repetitively. Right above the figure of the man is a separate inscription which translates to "Moses". This rock was carved with a unique form of Hebrew, which gave the appearance of ancient post-Exilic square Hebrew letters that later was shown to be derived from the modern Hebrew alphabet. Additional photos of the front and back can be found in an article published in the Epigraphic Society of Occasional Papers

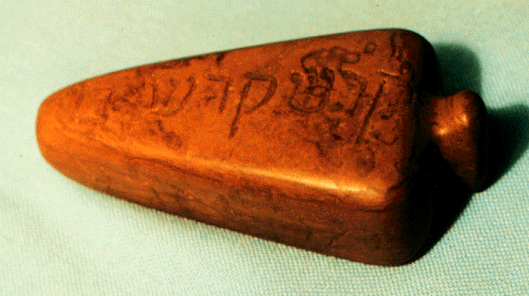
The Keystone

== Radiocarbon date of wooden platform ==
In 2014, Bradley Lepper of the Ohio History Connection discovered that a fragment of the wooden burial platform underneath which the Decalogue Stone was found had been preserved at Yale's Peabody Museum of Natural History. This sample yielded a calibrated radiocarbon date range of CAL AD 85 to CAL AD 135 (95% probability). Since the platform had been made from an approximately 2-foot (0.61 m) diameter oak tree, the burial itself could have been several decades later than this tree growth. These dates are consistent with the Hopewell culture that would have constructed the mound.

== Historical context ==
The Newark Holy Stones are an archaeological fraud used to support the "Lost Tribes" theory, which posits an ancient Israelite presence in Ohio. The idea that there is a connection between the ancient Hopewell mound builders and Jewish settlers that were in the Americas before Columbus is a form of pseudoarchaeology.

The first stone to be found was written in modern Hebrew. In July 1860 Abraham Geiger wrote in the New York Times that "the bungling work of an unskilled stone mason and the strangeness of some letters as well as the many mistakes and transpositions was his fault. The letters are not antique. This is not a relic of hoary antiquity".

Just over three months later, the second stone was found. This was not only considerably more elaborate, it was written in archaic Hebrew. Ken Feder compares this with someone today announcing that they had discovered a hitherto unknown play by Shakespeare which was then exposed as a modern forgery, then shortly thereafter announcing the discovery of a more plausible new play.

It is possible that the stones were forged to support a political viewpoint. Brad Lepper, of the Ohio Historical Society who has extensively studied the Hopewell culture, suggests that the artifacts might have been scientifically forged to help advance the theory on monogenism. In 1860, slavery was a subject of heated debate that was reaching a critical point in American society. Anthropology and other forms of science were often used in defense or opposition. Discussions promoting monogenism, for example, were often used to oppose slavery and segregation.

== Evidence they are fraudulent ==
=== David Wyrick ===
One of the arguments that they are fraudulent is that Wyrick faked the artifacts and planted them at the excavation sites. Prior to his discovery, Wyrick supported the belief that the Lost Tribes of Israel were the ancestors of ancient mound builders in Ohio. Wyrick spent a great deal of time searching a number of excavation sites at various mounds attempting to find supporting evidence of this belief.

In 1861, Wyrick published a pamphlet that described his account of the artifact discoveries. The publishing included woodcuts of the inscriptions found on the stones. When comparing Wyrick's woodcuts of the Decalogue to the actual inscription found on the stone, Wyrick made at least 38 errors involving 256 Hebrew letters. Mistakes include illegible and omitted letters. Wyrick's depiction of Moses on the woodcuts had inconsistencies as well. Wyrick shows Moses wearing a beret instead of a turban. He also shows Moses in a 19th-century dress instead of the flowering robe shown on the stone.

Some believe that the person or group responsible for the inscription had to have an extensive knowledge of the Hebrew language. Given that Wyrick made a large number of mistakes on the woodcuts seem to indicate that he may not have been the stone's author. Beverley H. Moseley, Jr., former art director of the Ohio Historical Society, compared the carving of Moses on the stone to Wyrick's woodcut copy. He concluded that both images could not have been made by the same person. After Wyrick's death, Colonel Charles Whittlesey published a paper in 1872 in which he recalls discovering a Hebrew Bible among Wyrick's personal items. Whittlesey concludes at the time that the stones were a hoax, and assumed that the Bible was Wyrick's source of inspiration for the inscription. This theory was later discredited after it was determined that the letters used on the Decalogue did not represent a style that would have been consistent with the theory.

The Hebrew version used in the inscriptions is another point of contention. The version used was post-Exilic, which would not be from a "Lost" Tribe. Some believe this is another example that shows the artifacts were either a hoax or did not date back to the time of the mound builders. Wyrick also made a claim in a letter he wrote to Joseph Henry in 1863—one year before his death—that he might have been a victim of a hoax.

=== Rev. John W. McCarty and stonecutter Elijah Sutton ===
Rev. John W. McCarty and Elijah Sutton were both residents of Newark when the Decalogue Stone and the Keystone were found. Elijah Sutton was a stonecutter with no other direct link to the event other than his part in carving Wyrick's headstone when he died. However, it is asserted that because the Decalogue Stone is made from similar materials and is of the same width (thickness) as his headstones, he must have cut the stone. As for Rev. John W. McCarty, he played a more direct role in the artifact's discovery.

It was with the help of McCarty that the stone was translated. Upon receiving the stone McCarty was able to translate it within hours. However, "A few days later, McCarty published a second article, correcting some errors he had made his initial interpretation. In his first attempt, for example, he read the letters over the head of the carved figure as Mem-Shin-Heth, or Meshiach (Messiah), and concluded, as a good Episcopalian minister, that the figure was intended to represent Jesus Christ. In his second version, he read these letters correctly as Mem-Shin-He, or Moshe, and conceded that the figure in fact represented Moses. If he had composed the text himself, he would surely have gotten the translation right on his first try, particularly on such an important (and, in retrospect, obvious) point."

=== Source for the design ===
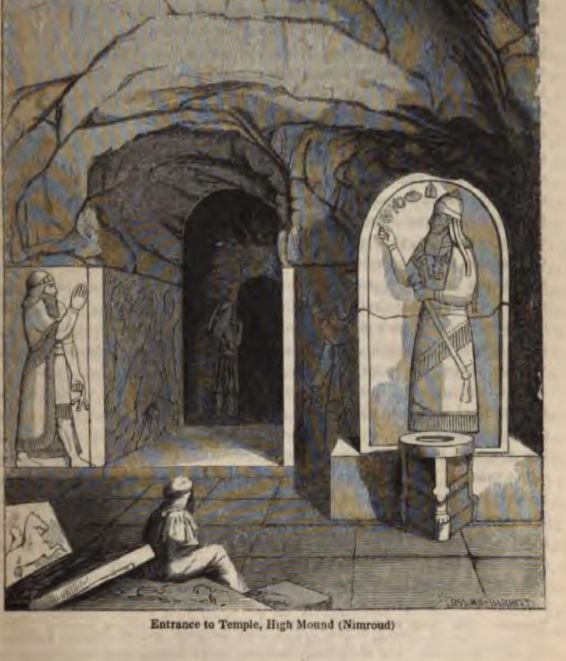

Archaeologist Brad Lepper believes that the inspiration for the Decalogue stone was Austen Henry Layard's book Discoveries in the Ruins of Nineveh and Babylon. Layard's work had become a sensation at the time and McCarty had access to it and given his profession would have taken an interest in it. Lepper writes that a stone carving on a temple entrance "looked very familiar. In fact, it duplicated, in great detail, the form of the Decalogue Stone. Compare the images for yourself. Both have a tombstone-shaped frame with a bearded man shown in left profile and the left arm of both men is bent. Both men are wearing long gowns and have some sort of domed head-covering. Finally, there is an inscription arcing over the heads of both men."

Scholarly debate on the authenticity of the stones has continued for decades. Epigrapher Rochelle I. Altman believes that "The evidence is quite clear: the artifacts were indeed stolen from a European settler, as Fischel surmised, and deposited at these sites earlier in the nineteenth century."

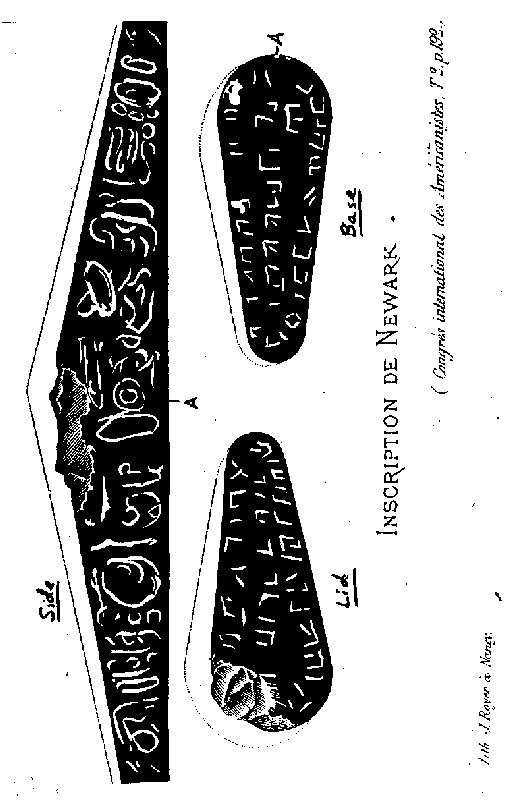

== Related discoveries ==
There were other stones found at the Newark site, like the Keystone. Two other stones were also found at Newark shortly after Wyrick's death (they have since been lost). These stones were quickly dismissed as fakes when the local dentist, John H. Nicol, claimed that he had carved and introduced the stones to the site.

A fifth stone was allegedly found at the same site as the Decalogue stone two years later by David M. Johnson, a banker, and Nathaniel Roe Bradner, a physician. Named the Johnson-Bradner Stone, it has since been lost. A lithograph of the stone, published in France, still survives. The letters on the lid and base of the Johnson-Bradner stone are in the same peculiar alphabet as the Decalogue inscription, and appear to wrap around in the same manner as on the Decalogue's back platform.

Additionally, a teacup sized bowl made from the same stone material was found nearby by one of the persons accompanying Wyrick.

== See also ==
- Bat Creek Inscription
- Los Lunas Decalogue Stone
