= Bat Creek Stone =

Fabricated inscribed stone tablet

The Bat Creek Stone is an inscribed stone tablet, widely considered to be a hoax, found by John W. Emmert on February 14, 1889. Emmert claimed to have found the tablet in Tipton Mound 3 during an excavation of Hopewell burial mounds in Loudon County, Tennessee. This excavation was part of a larger series of excavations that aimed to clarify the controversy regarding who is responsible for building the various mounds found in the Eastern United States.

In the late nineteenth century, when the tablet was found, Cyrus Thomas, the director of the mound excavations, concluded the inscription presented letters from the Cherokee alphabet. This interpretation was accepted at the time but was contested about a century later by Cyrus H. Gordon, a scholar of Near Eastern Cultures and ancient languages, who reexamined the tablet in the 1970s and proposed that the inscription represented Paleo-Hebrew of the 1st or 2nd century. The consensus among archaeologists is that the tablet is a hoax. Supporting its authenticity, economist J. Huston McCulloch argued that the ancient Hebrew text on the stone supports pre-Columbian transoceanic contact theories. Countering the notion of pre-Columbian transoceanic contact theories, archaeologists Robert Mainfort and Mary Kwas believe that the inscription is not a genuine paleo-Hebrew artifact but rather a 19th-century forgery. They point to similarities between the inscription and an illustration of Paleo-Hebrew writing published before the stone’s discovery, and also question the reliability of the stone’s reported archaeological context. Furthermore, the conclusions drawn by Mainfort and Kwas have been accepted by other archaeologists and members of academic communities.

Today, the question of who made the tablet and why remains unanswered.

== Physical description of the tablet ==
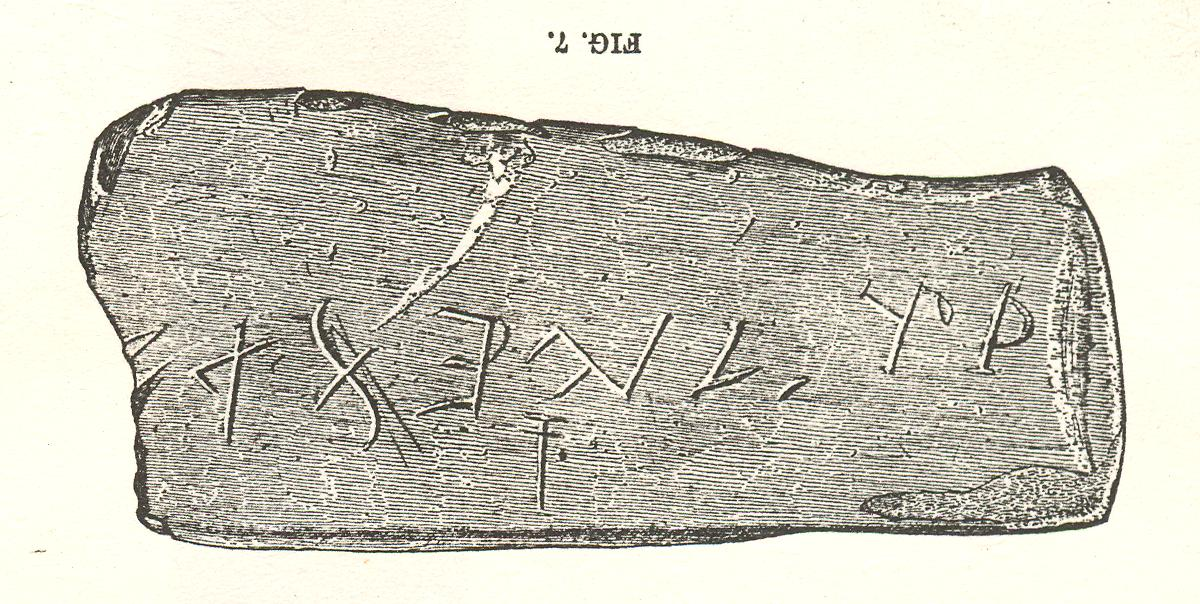
An 1890 lithograph of the tablet without the now present parallel markings

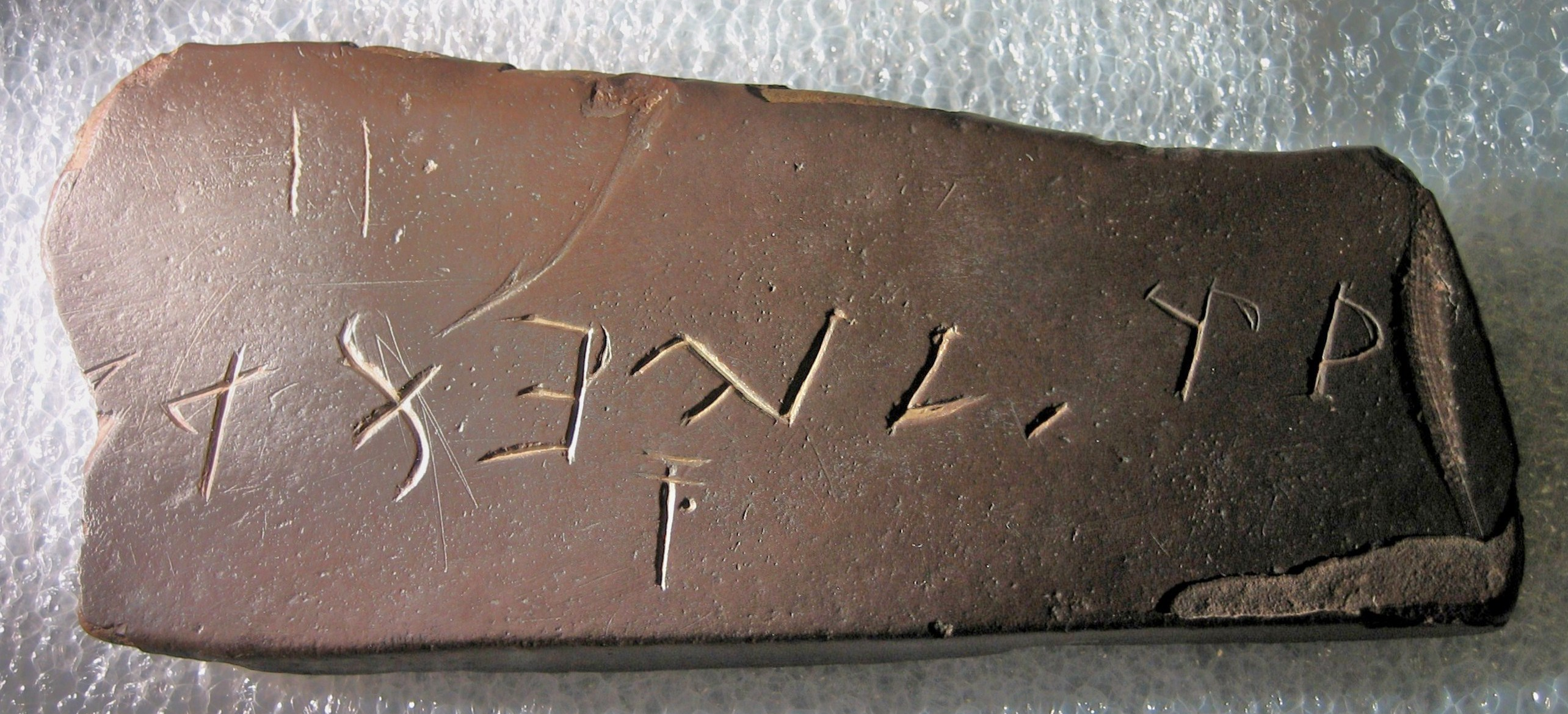
A recent image of the tablet where the parallel markings are present in the top left corner

The stone itself is 11.4 centimeters (4.5 inches) long and 5.1 centimeters (2.0 inches) wide. The inscription consists of at least eight distinct characters. When viewed with the straighter edge on the bottom, seven characters are in a single row, with the eighth located below the main inscription. These eight characters are, on average, 2–3mm in depth. The marks are characterized by smooth, "rounded grooves". This shape suggests the stone's creator used a rounded instrument to make the engraving. The entire surface of the stone appears to be polished, which further contributes to the smooth, rounded edges of the markings. An unknown party added two nearly parallel vertical strokes while the stone was stored in the National Museum of Natural History from 1894 and 1970. This is evident by the lack of the markings in the first photograph of the stone, published in the 1890–1891 annual report of the Bureau of Ethnology, and their appearance in photos after 1970. These markings are characterized by V shape carvings indicating they were created by a sharper tool than the initial eight characters.

== Context of excavation ==
North America has a diverse, millennia-long history. Native American civilizations long predate the introduction of European settler colonialism. Part of this history remains embedded in the advanced architecture of the Adena and Hopewell people. The Adena and Hopewell peoples, among others in eastern and midwestern North America, constructed significant earthworks and mounds.

Archaeological evidence has clarified that these civilizations, not the proposed vanished, monolithic Mound Builders, created the widespread structures. The myth of the Mound-builders is viewed by many academics, including Kenneth Feder and Sarah E. Baires, as a damaging belief that discredits Native American peoples by claiming they were not the creators of the phenomenal mounds, and another group of people, frequently referred to as a "Vanished Race", are responsible for their creation and persisting splendor. This belief was once widespread and influential among Americans prior to the twentieth century, reflecting the sentiments of European settler colonialism. Baires writes that the attribution of the mound builders to "any group—other than Native Americans" reflects the propensity of European academics to erase "Native American ties to their cultural landscapes". Destruction of mounds occurred alongside the forced removal of Native peoples from their land and the Mound Builders theory further distanced them from their heritage. These acts served as a form of cultural genocide by European colonizers alongside the physical movement of settlers onto native lands.

When the Bat Creek Inscription was found, it entered into this important debate about who the mound builders were. Although in the twenty-first century it is clear that the mounds were built by different Native American peoples and served different functions, at the start of the nineteenth century, there was genuine confusion about who built the mounds. To clarify the debate, the Federal Bureau for the study of ethnology appointed entomologist Cyrus Thomas as Director of a new Division of Mound Exploration. With a budget of $60,000 provided by the U.S. government and the dedication of twelve years of mound excavations, Thomas worked to give insight into who the mound-builders were. More specifically, Thomas focused on assessing the connection between the mound-builders and the Indigenous communities who lived in the area during European colonization. Archeologist Kenneth Feder has commended Thomas's efforts, which "initiated the most extensive and intensive study" of the mounds, their builders, and the Mound Builder theory. Thomas's efforts were crucial because of their ability to destabilize the myth of the Mound Builders by providing irrefutable evidence that Indigenous Americans constructed the mounds. Due to the efforts of Thomas and his team, and with the aid of his published work which extensively presented his findings, "the myth of a vanished race had been dealt a fatal blow".

== Geographic context ==
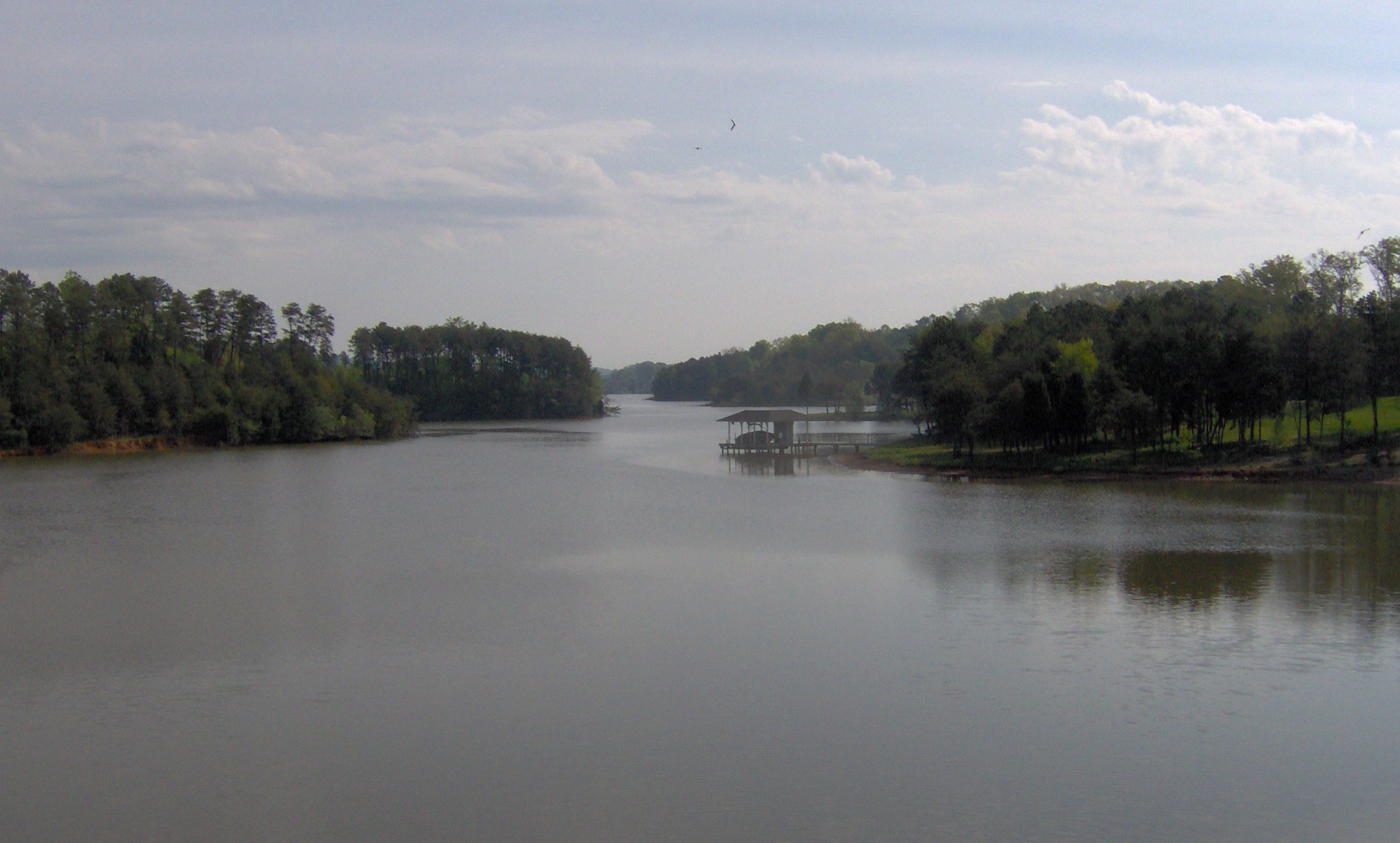
Bat Creek, now an inlet of Tellico Lake

The Little Tennessee River enters Tennessee from the Appalachian Mountains to the south and flows northward for just over 50 miles (80 km) before emptying into the Tennessee River near Lenoir City. The completion of Tellico Dam at the mouth of the Little Tennessee in 1979 created a reservoir that spans the lower 33 miles (53 km) of the river. Bat Creek empties into the southwest bank of the Little Tennessee 12 miles (19 km) upstream from the mouth of the river. While much of the original confluence of Bat Creek and the Little Tennessee was submerged by the lake, the mound in which the Bat Creek Stone was found was located above the reservoir's operating levels.

== Archaeological excavations ==
=== Initial excavation ===
Thomas did not excavate the mounds himself, but delegated field work to assistants. John Emmert excavated Bat Creek Mound 3, doing so "alone and in isolation". According to Emmert, the site consisted of one large mound (Mound 1) on the east bank of the creek and two smaller mounds (Mound 2 and Mound 3) on the west bank. Mound 1 had a diameter of 108 feet (33 m) and a height of 8 feet (2.4 m), and it was located on the first terrace above the river. Today, this mound is submerged by a reservoir. Mound 2 had a diameter of 44 feet (13 m) and height of 10 feet (3.0 m), and Mound 3 had a diameter of 28 feet (8.5 m) and height of 5 feet (1.5 m). Both Mound 2 and 3 were located higher than Mound 1. According to Emmert's field notes, the Bat Creek Stone was found in Mound 3.

In Mound 3 Emmert reported finding "two copper bracelets, an engraved stone, a small drilled fossil, a copper bead, a bone implement, and some small pieces of polished wood soft and colored green by contact with the copper bracelet". His excavation also revealed nine skeletons, seven of which were laid out in a row with their heads facing north, and two more laid out nearby, one with its head facing north and the other with its head facing south. He reported that the Bat Creek Stone was found under the skull of the south-facing skeleton. The two bracelets found in the Mound were initially identified by both Emmert and Thomas as "copper", but a 1970 Smithsonian analysis concluded the bracelets were in fact heavily leaded yellow brass.

=== Recent excavation ===
In 1967 the Tennessee Valley Authority announced plans to build Tellico Dam at the mouth of the Little Tennessee River and asked the University of Tennessee Department of Anthropology to conduct salvage excavations in the Little Tennessee Valley. Litigation and environmental concerns stalled the dam's completion until 1979, allowing extensive excavations at multiple sites throughout the valley. In the late 1960s and 1970s, the Tellico Archaeological Project, conducted by the University of Tennessee Department of Anthropology investigated over two dozen sites and uncovered evidence of substantial habitation in the valley during the Archaic (8000–1000 BC), Woodland (1000 BC – 1000 AD), Mississippian (900–1600 AD), and Cherokee (c. 1600–1838) periods. Mound 1 of the Bat Creek Site was excavated in 1975. Investigators concluded that the mound was a "platform" mound typical of the Mississippian period. Pre-Mississippian artifacts dating to the Archaic and Woodland periods were also found. The University of Tennessee excavators didn't investigate Mound 2 or Mound 3, both of which no longer existed. Neither the University of Tennessee's excavation of the Bat Creek Site nor any other excavations in the Little Tennessee Valley uncovered any evidence that would indicate Pre-Columbian contact with Old World civilizations.

== Analysis and debate ==
The Cherokee syllabary, initially identified by Cyrus Thomas (1890, 1894) as the source of the letters on the Bat Creek Stone

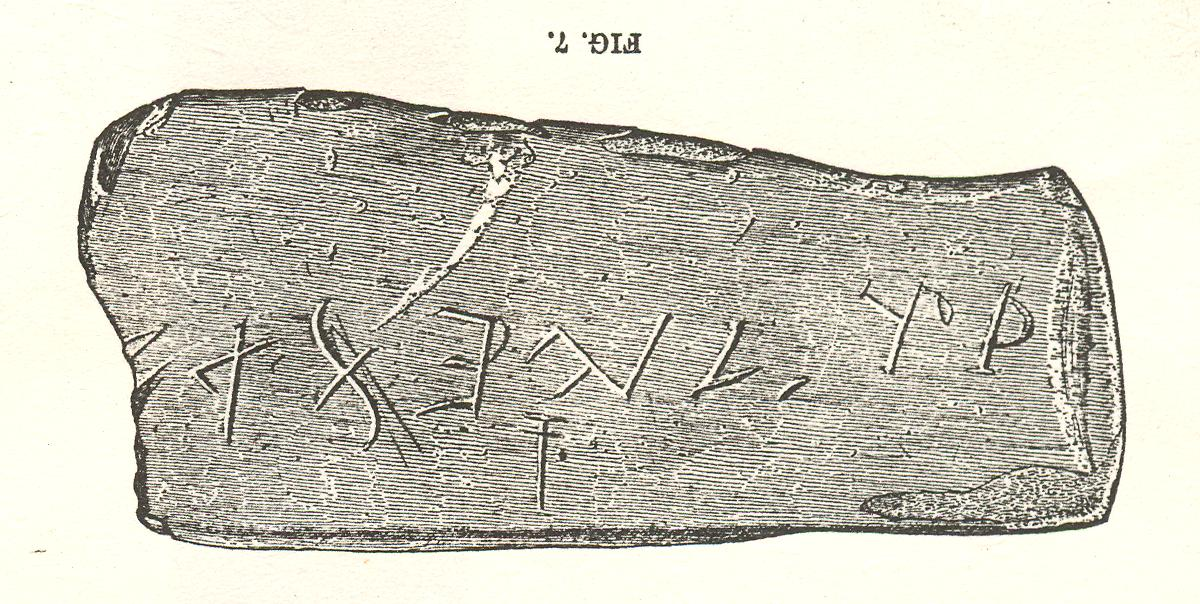
Lithograph of the Bat Creek inscription, as first published by Thomas (1890) (the original illustration has been inverted to the orientation proposed by Gordon for "Paleo-Hebrew")

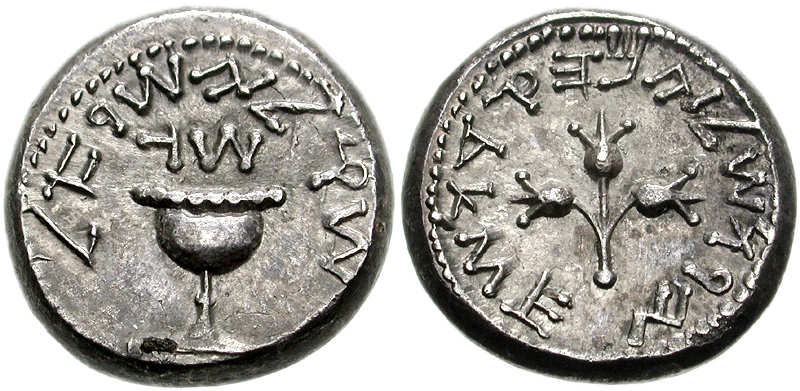
Coin of the First Jewish War, with Paleo-Hebrew letters similar to those Gordon (1971) claimed are present on the Bat Creek inscription

In the 1894 Report on the Mound Explorations of the Bureau of Ethnology, the inscription was first officially mentioned along with other artifacts recovered from the Bat Creek Mound excavations. In the report, Cyrus Thomas "claimed that the marks on the Bat Creek Stone represented characters of the Cherokee syllabary and used the inscription to support his hypothesis that the Cherokee constructed many of the earthen mounds and enclosures in eastern North America". However, this initial identification as Cherokee was later proven to be flawed. The "Cherokee writing system was invented in 1819," and If the tablet were inscribed with Cherokee, this would suggest Mound 3 is much younger than "the solid archaeological data" that identifies it as much older. As Feder explains, "The Bat Creek Stone was an outlier, impossible to put into genuine historical context, and though few said it out loud, it was assumed by many that the artifact had been faked". Despite this incongruity, at the time of its finding, there was little controversy regarding the inscription, and in fact, "Thomas did not discuss the Bat Creek stone in any of his later substantive publications".

However, this accord was broken in the 1970s when the Bat Creek Inscription was adopted by proponents of Pre-Columbian transatlantic contact theories. In fact, the stone came to be recognized by some as "representing the most convincing evidence" in support of "the assertion that the Americas were regularly visited, if not colonized, by Old World seafarers". This interpretation began in the 1970s when the stone was examined by professor Dr. Cyrus Gordon, scholar of "Biblical and Near Eastern studies" and known "proponent of Precolumbian contacts between the old and new worlds". Gordon concluded that Thomas had been viewing the inscription "upside down", and when re-read in its proper orientation, the inscription represented "ancient Hebrew". He asserted that the inscription "could be translated as some variation of 'For the Jews'". The use of the stone as evidence for Pre-Columbian transatlantic contact theories was exacerbated in 1988 by J. Huston McCulloch, Economics professor at Ohio State University. McCulloch mostly agreed with Gordon's assessment of the stone as Ancient Hebrew, and expressed, "My own conviction is that the Bat Creek inscription is a rustic, and therefore imperfect, specimen of paleo-Hebrew". He went on to claim, "it does not by itself indicate anything more than a minimal contact with the New World by a few Hebrew sailors". However, the interpretations advanced by Gordon and McCulloch have been challenged by a number of archaeologists, many of whom have concluded that the Bat Creek Stone is a nineteenth-century forgery.

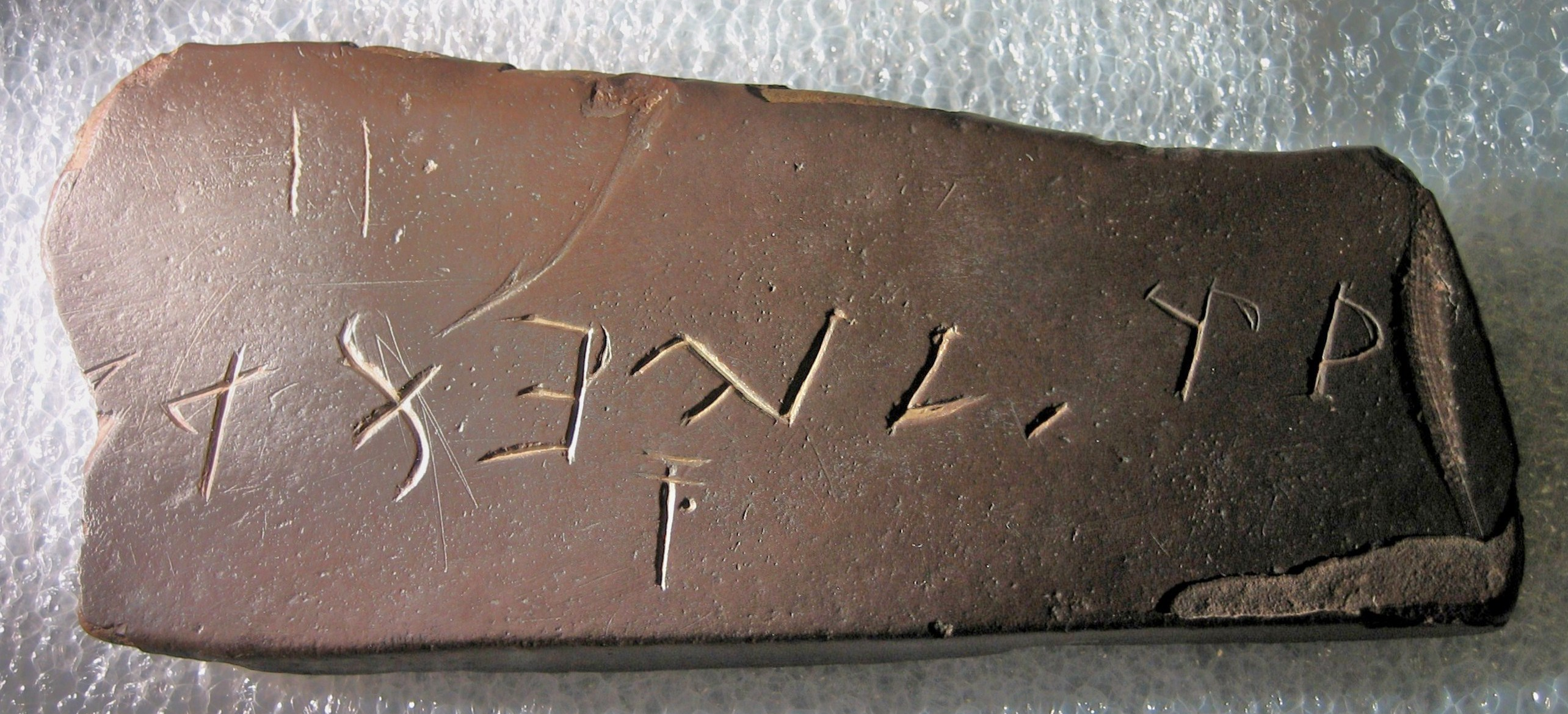

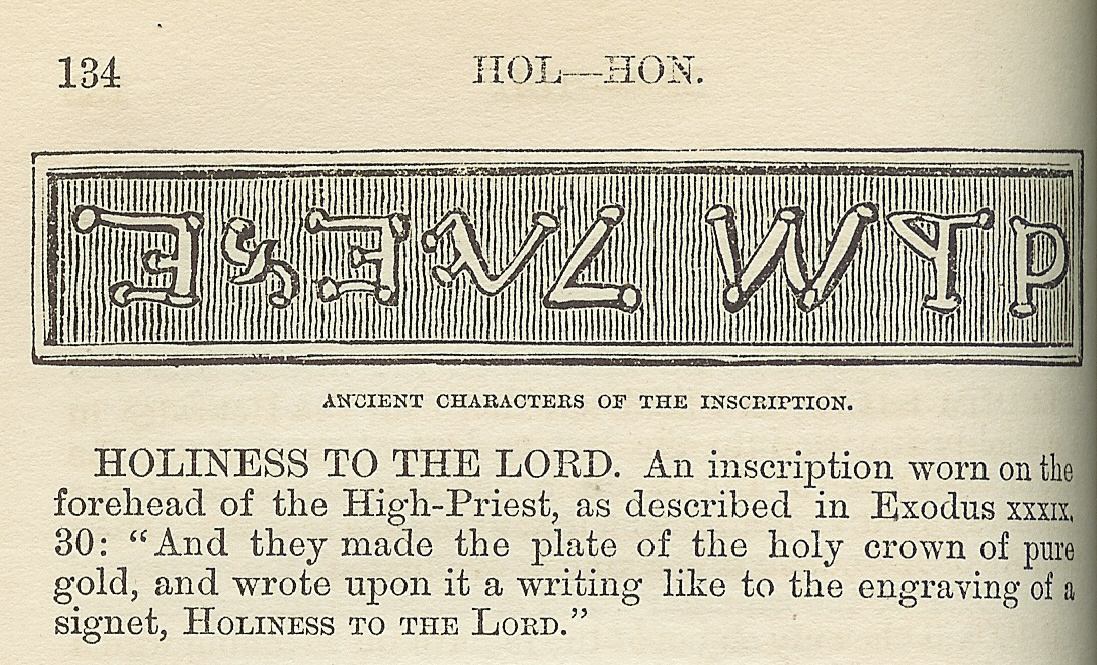
Masonic artist's impression of Biblical phrase 𐤒𐤃𐤔 𐤋𐤉𐤄𐤅𐤄 (QDSh LYHWH) in paleo-Hebrew script (Macoy 1868: 134), compared with the inscribed stone

Robert Mainfort and Mary Kwas concluded that the inscription is not genuine paleo-Hebrew but rather a nineteenth-century forgery, a conclusion supported by other archaeologists, including Kenneth Feder. Mainfort and Kwas argued that the inscription was most likely copied from the General History, Cyclopedia, and Dictionary of Freemasonry. They cited similarities between the Bat Creek inscription and a published illustration of paleo-Hebrew characters, and noted that this specific volume was "extensively reprinted during the latter half of the nineteenth century" and would have been available to the alleged forger. Archaeologist Bradley T. Lepper wrote that "the historical detective work of Mainfort and Kwas has exposed one famous hoax". Similarly, Professor of Biblical Studies and Ancient Near Eastern Studies at Johns Hopkins University, Kyle McCarter, stated that "the Bat Creek stone has no place in the inventory of Hebrew inscriptions from the time of the First Jewish Revolt against Rome" and "belongs to the melodrama of American archaeology in the late 19th century". McCarter further concluded, "It seems probable that we are dealing here not with a coincidental similarity but with a fraud".

== Current location ==
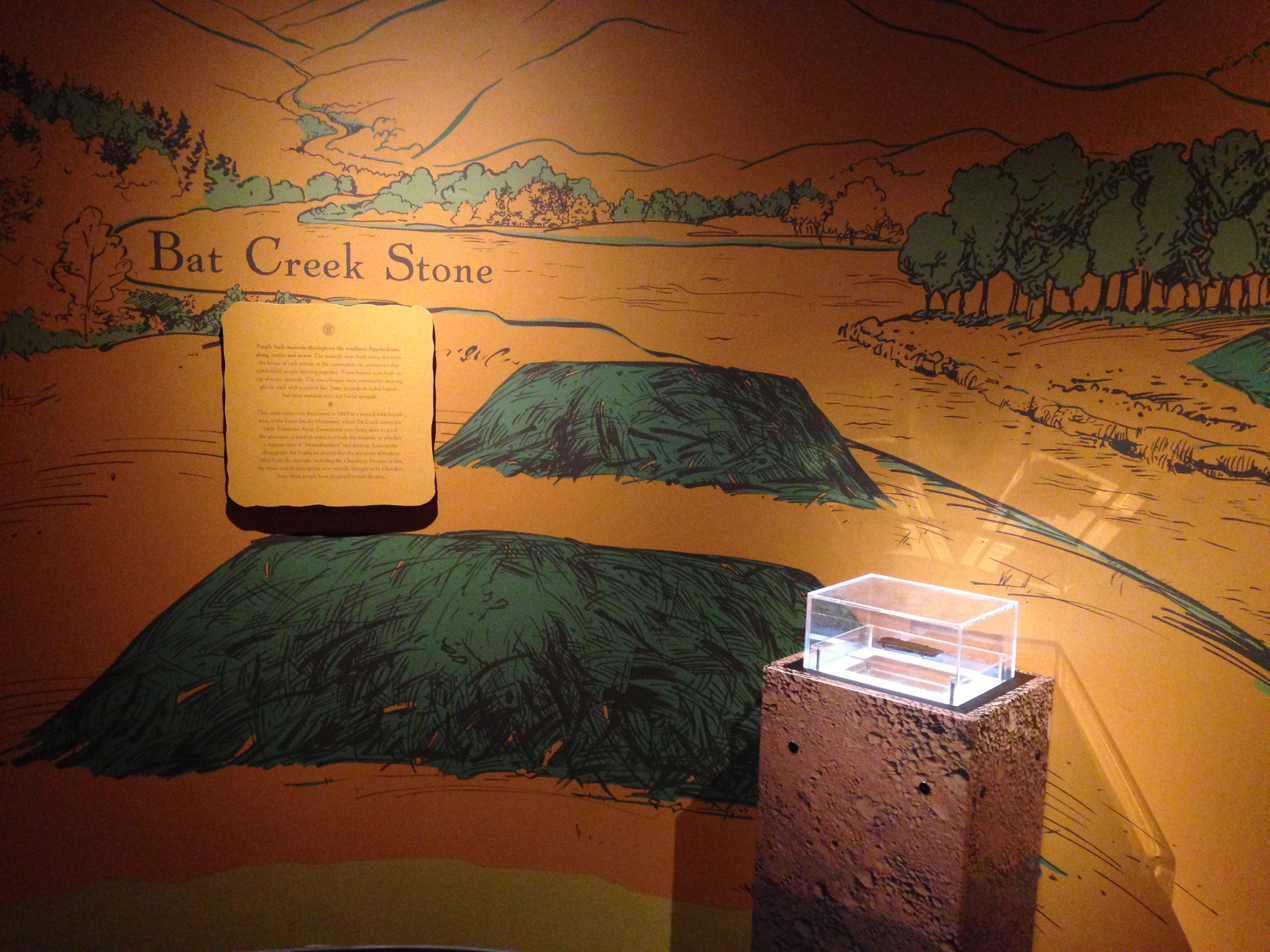
The Bat Creek Stone on display at the Museum of the Cherokee Indian, Cherokee, NC

The Bat Creek Stone remains the property of the Smithsonian Institution, where it resides when not on loan or exhibit. It is catalogued in the collections of the Department of Anthropology, National Museum of Natural History, catalog number A134902-0.

From August 2002 to November 2013, it was on loan for exhibition to the Frank H. McClung Museum at the University of Tennessee, Knoxville. It was subsequently lent for exhibition to the Museum of the Cherokee Indian in Cherokee, North Carolina, where it was on display from 2015 to 2021.

== See also ==
- Adena culture
- Hopewell tradition
- Grave Creek Stone
- Mound builders
- Newark Holy Stones
- Pre-Columbian trans-oceanic contact theories
- Smithsonian Bureau of American Ethnology (Smithsonian Bureau of Ethnology until 1897)
- Tucson artifacts
- Yehud coinage

== Sources ==
- Chapman, Jefferson. Tellico Archaeology: 12,000 Years of Native American History Norris, Tenn.: Tennessee Valley Authority, 1985
- Faulker, Charles H. The Bat Creek Stone. Tennessee Anthropological Association, Miscellaneous Paper No. 15, 1992. Reprints pp. 391–3 of Thomas (1894), McCulloch (1988), and Mainfort and Kwas (1991), with introduction by Faulkner.
- Feder, Kenneth L. Frauds, Myths and Mysteries: Science and Pseudoscience in Archaeology, 3rd ed. Mountain View, CA: Mayfield Publishing Co., 1999.
- Gordon, Cyrus H. Before Columbus: Links Between the Old World and Ancient America. New York: Crown Publishers, 1971.
- Hudson, Charles. The Juan Pardo Expeditions: Explorations of the Carolinas and Tennessee, 1566–1568. Tuscaloosa, Ala.: University of Alabama Press, 2005.
- Mainfort, Robert C., Jr. and Mary L. Kwas. "The Bat Creek Stone: Judeans in Tennessee?" Tennessee Anthropologist 16 (Spring 1991): 1–19. Reprinted in Faulkner (1992). (archived on Wayback Machine)
- Mainfort, Robert C., Jr. and Mary L. Kwas. "The Bat Creek Fraud: A Final Statement". Tennessee Anthropologist 18 (Fall 1993): 87–93. (archived on Wayback Machine)
- Macoy, Robert, General History, Cyclopedia and Dictionary of Freemasonry, Masonic Publishing Co., New York, 3rd ed., 1868, p. 134. (Same illustration appears on p. 169 of 1870 ed. and 1989 reprint ed., but not in 1867 ed.)
- McCarter, P. Kyle, Jr. "Let's be Serious About the Bat Creek Stone". Biblical Archaeology Review 19 (July/Aug. 1993): 54–55, 83.
- McCulloch, J. Huston. "The Bat Creek Inscription: Cherokee or Hebrew?" Tennessee Anthropologist 13 (Fall 1988): 79–123. Reprinted in Faulkner (1992).
- McCulloch, J. Huston (1993a). "The Bat Creek Stone: A Reply to Mainfort and Kwas". Tennessee Anthropologist 18 (Spring 1993): 1–26.
- McCulloch, J. Huston (1993b). "Did Judean Refugees Escape to Tennessee?" Biblical Archaeology Review 19 (July/Aug. 1993): 46–53, 82–83.
- McKusick, Marshall. "Canaanites in America: A New Scripture in Stone?" Biblical Archaeologist, Summer 1979, pp. 137–40.
- McKusick, Marshall. "The Cherokee Solution to the Bat Creek Enigma". Biblical Archaeology Review, 20 (Jan./Feb. 1994): 83–84, 86.
- Mertz, Henriette. The Wine Dark Sea: Homer's Heroic Epic of the North Atlantic. Chicago: Mertz, 1964. ASIN B0006CHG68.
- Schroedl, Gerald F. Archaeological Investigations at the Harrison Branch and Bat Creek Sites. University of Tennessee, Department of Anthropology, Report of Investigations No. 10, 1975.
- Smithsonian Institution Archives. "Funds for Ethnology and Mound Survey", dated March 3, 1881.
- Thomas, Cyrus H. The Cherokees in Pre-Columbian Times N.D.C. Hodges, New York, 1890.
- Thomas, Cyrus H. "Report on the Mound Explorations of the Bureau of Ethnology", in Twelfth Annual Report of the Bureau of American Ethnology to the Secretary of the Smithsonian Institution 1890–91, 1894. Government Printing Office, Washington, D.C. pp. 391–3 reprinted in Faulkner (1992).
- Robert Macoy, George Oliver. General History, Cyclopedia and Dictionary of Freemasonry (1870). Pp 181
